= Museo del Prado =

National art museum in Madrid, Spain

Coordinates: 40°24′50″N 3°41′32″W

Museo Nacional del Prado
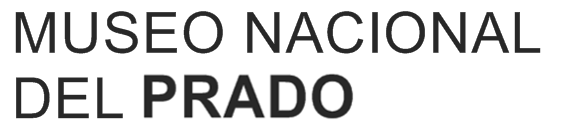

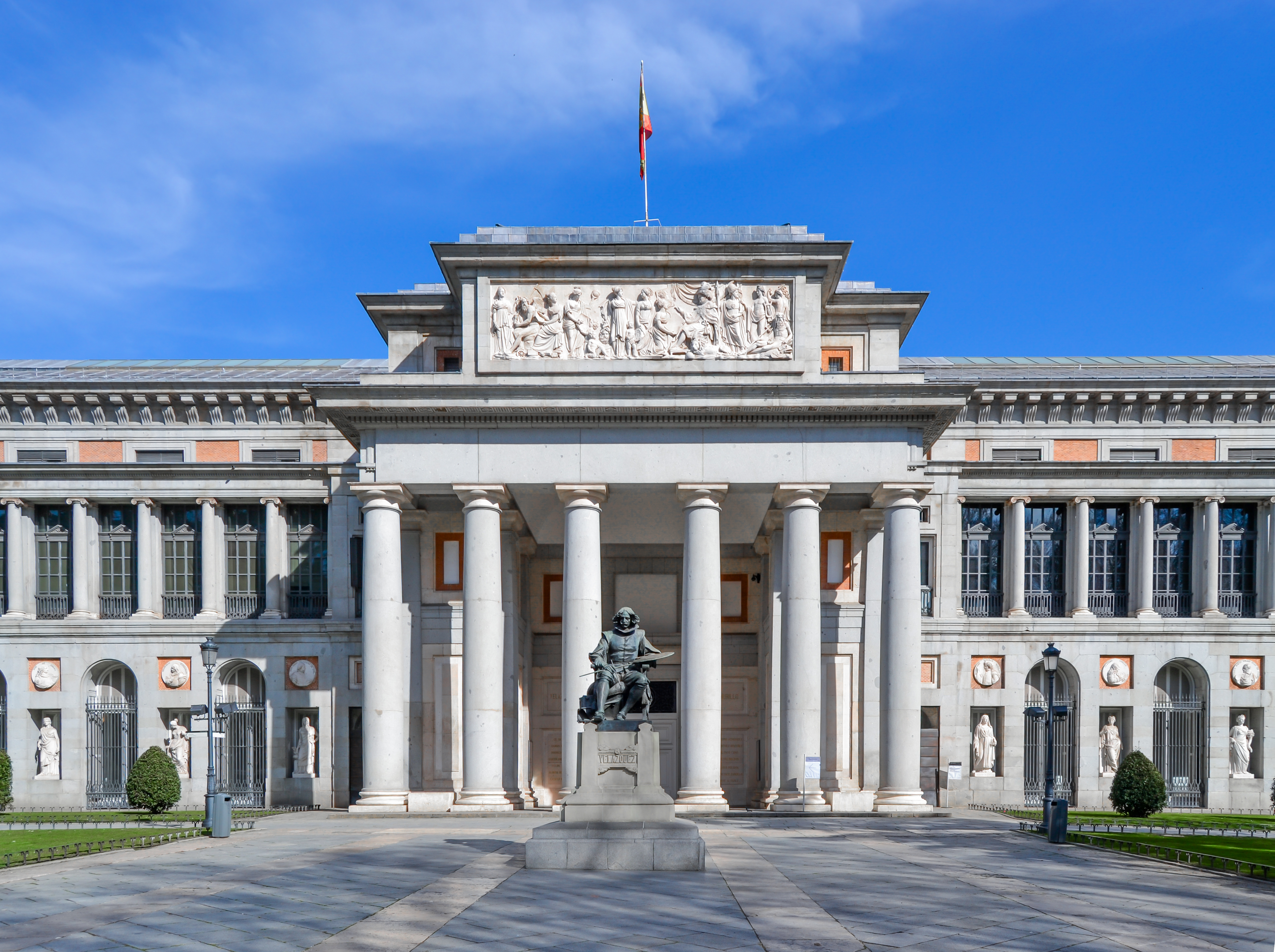
- Front façade (Velázquez entrance) in 2016
- Established: 19 November 1819
- Location: Paseo del Prado, Madrid, Spain
- Type: Art museum, historic site
- Visitors: 3,337,550 (2023) Ranked 13th globally (2023)
- Director: Miguel Falomir
- Public transit access: Banco de España; Estación del Arte
- Website: Official website

Site notes
- Architect: Juan de Villanueva

Spanish Cultural Heritage
- Official name: Museo Nacional del Prado
- Type: Non-movable
- Criteria: Monument
- Designated: 1962
- Reference no.: RI-51-0001374

The Museo del Prado (/ˈprɑːdoʊ/ PRAH-doh; Spanish pronunciation: [muˈseo ðel ˈpɾaðo]), officially known as Museo Nacional del Prado, is the main Spanish national art museum, located in central Madrid. It houses collections of European art, dating from the 12th century to the early 20th century, based on the former Spanish royal collection, and is the single best collection of Spanish art in the world. Founded as a museum of paintings and sculpture in 1819, it also contains important collections of other types of works. The numerous works by Francisco Goya, the single most extensively represented artist, as well as by Hieronymus Bosch, El Greco, Peter Paul Rubens, Titian, and Diego Velázquez, are some of the highlights of the collection. Velázquez and his keen eye and sensibility were also responsible for bringing much of the museum's fine collection of Italian masters to Spain, now one of the largest outside of Italy.

The collection currently comprises around 8,200 drawings, 7,600 paintings, 4,800 prints, and 1,000 sculptures, in addition to many other works of art and historic documents. As of 2012, the museum displayed about 1,300 works in the main buildings, while around 3,100 works were on temporary loan to various museums and official institutions. The remainder were in storage.

The Prado was the 16th most-visited museum in the world in 2020. The Prado and the nearby Thyssen-Bornemisza Museum and the Museo Reina Sofía form Madrid's Golden Triangle of Art along the Paseo del Prado, which was added to the UNESCO World Heritage list in 2021.

== History ==
The building that is now the home of the Museo Nacional del Prado was designed in 1785 by architect of the Enlightenment in Spain Juan de Villanueva on the orders of Charles III to house the Natural History Cabinet. Nonetheless, the building's final function was not decided until the monarch's grandson, Ferdinand VII, encouraged by his wife, Queen María Isabel de Braganza, decided to use it as a new Royal Museum of Paintings and Sculptures. The royal museum, which would soon become known as the National Museum of Painting and Sculpture, and subsequently the Museo Nacional del Prado, opened to the public for the first time in November 1819. It was created with the double aim of showing the works of art belonging to the Spanish Crown and to demonstrate to the rest of Europe that Spanish art was of equal merit to any other national school. Also, this museum needed several renovations during the 19th and 20th centuries, because of the increase of the collection as well as the increase of the public who wants to see all the collection that the museum hosted.

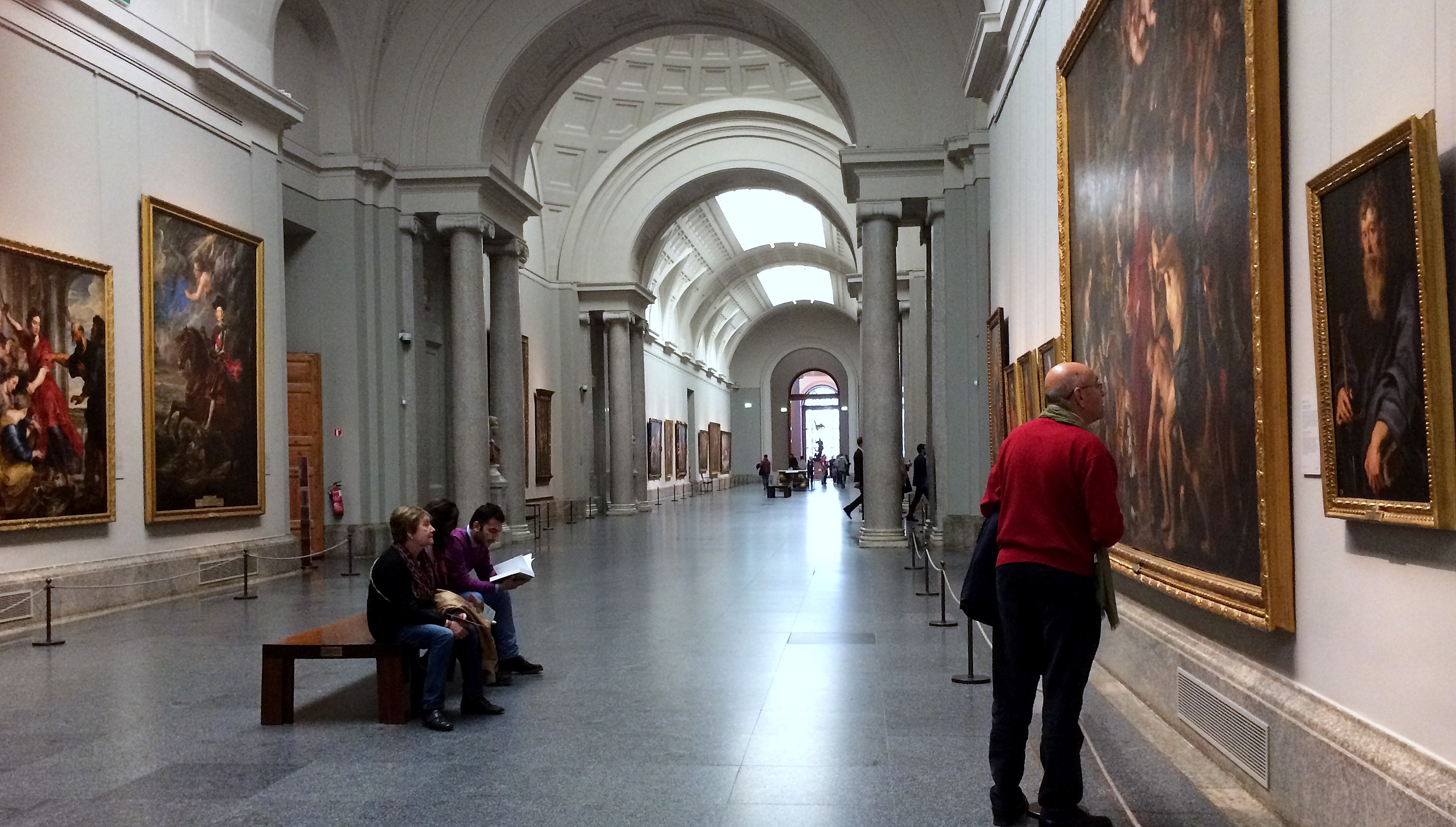
In the main exhibition hall, first floor

The first catalogue of the museum, published in 1819 and solely devoted to Spanish painting, included 311 paintings, although at that time the museum housed 1,510 from the various royal residences, the Reales Sitios, including works from other schools. The exceptionally important royal collection, which forms the nucleus of the present-day Museo del Prado, started to increase significantly in the 16th century during the time of Charles V and continued under the succeeding Habsburg and Bourbon monarchs. Their efforts and determination led to the royal collection being enriched by some of the masterpieces now to be seen in the Prado. These include The Descent from the Cross by Rogier van der Weyden, The Garden of Earthly Delights by Hieronymous Bosch, The Nobleman with his Hand on his Chest by El Greco, Death of the Virgin by Mantegna, The Holy Family, known as "La Perla", by Raphael, Equestrian Portrait of Charles V by Titian, Christ Washing the Disciples' Feet by Tintoretto, Dürer's Self-portrait at 26, Las Meninas by Velázquez, The Three Graces by Rubens, and The Family of Charles IV by Goya.

Francisco Goya

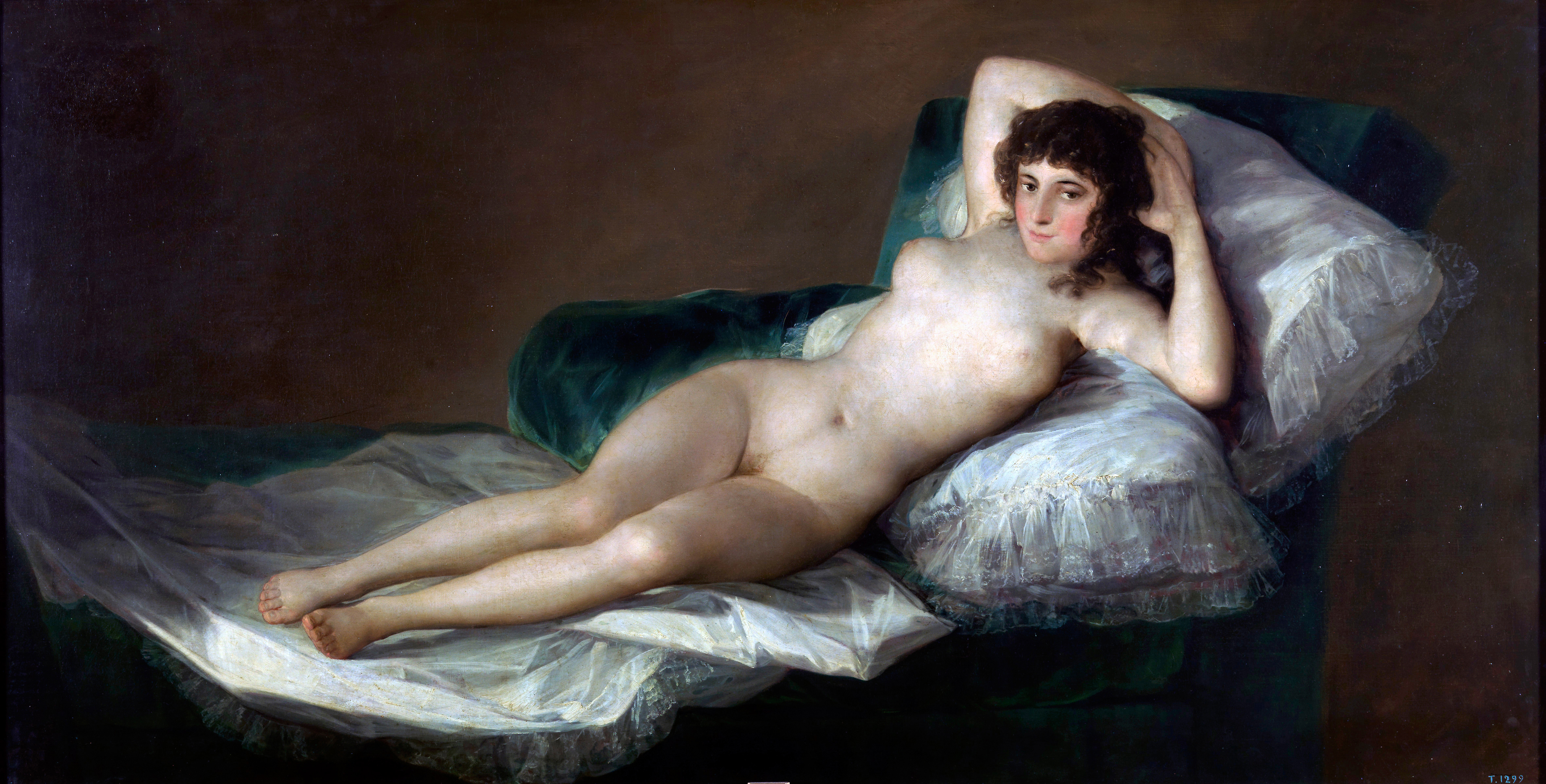
La maja desnuda, oil on canvas, (c. 1797–1800)

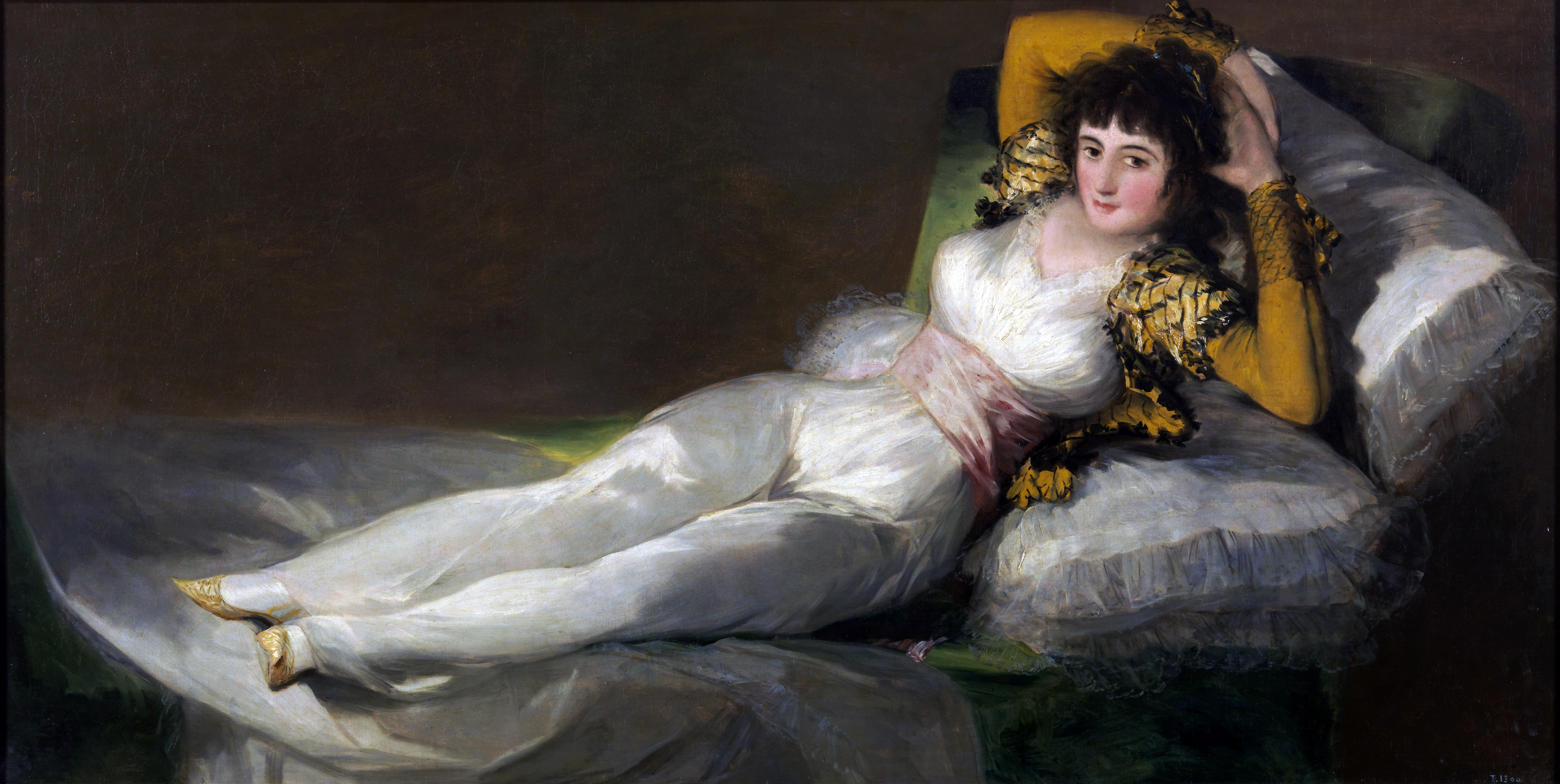
La maja vestida, oil on canvas, (c. 1800–1807)

In addition to works from the Spanish royal collection, the other holdings increased and enriched the museum with further masterpieces, such as the two Majas by Goya. Among the now closed museums whose collections have been added to that of the Prado were the Museo de la Trinidad in 1872, and the Museo de Arte Moderno in 1971. In addition, numerous legacies, donations and purchases have been of crucial importance for the growth of the collection. Various works entered the Prado from the Museo de la Trinidad, including The Fountain of Grace by the School of Van Eyck, the Santo Domingo and San Pedro Martír altarpieces painted for the monastery of Santo Tomás in Ávila by Pedro Berruguete, and the five canvases by El Greco executed for the Colegio de doña María de Aragón. Most of the Museum's 19th-century paintings come from the former Museo de Arte Moderno, including works by the Madrazos, José de Madrazo and Federico de Madrazo, Vicente López, Carlos de Haes, Eduardo Rosales and Sorolla.

Upon the deposition of Isabella II in 1868, the museum was nationalized and acquired the new name of "Museo del Prado". The building housed the royal collection of arts, and it rapidly proved too small. The first enlargement to the museum took place in 1918. Since the creation of the Museo del Prado more than 2,300 paintings have been incorporated into its collection, as well as numerous sculptures, prints, drawings and works of art through bequests, donations and purchases, which account for most of the New Acquisitions. Numerous bequests have enriched the museum's holdings, such as the outstanding collection of medals left to the museum by Pablo Bosch; the drawings and items of decorative art left by Pedro Fernández Durán as well as Van der Weyden's masterpiece, Duran Madonna; and the Ramón de Errazu bequest of 19th-century paintings. Particularly important donations include Barón Emile d'Erlanger's gift of Goya's Black Paintings in 1881. Among the numerous works that have entered the collection through purchase are some outstanding ones acquired in recent years including two works by El Greco, The Fable and The Flight into Egypt acquired in 1993 and 2001, Goya's The Countess of Chinchon bought in 2000, Velázquez's Portrait of Ferdinando Brandani, acquired in 2003, Bruegel's The Wine of Saint Martin's Day bought in 2010 and Fra Angelico's Madonna of the Pomegranate purchased in 2016. Some art purchases are made possible with the support of private patronage, mainly through the non-profit organizations Fundación Amigos del Museo del Prado and the US-based American Friends of the Prado Museum .

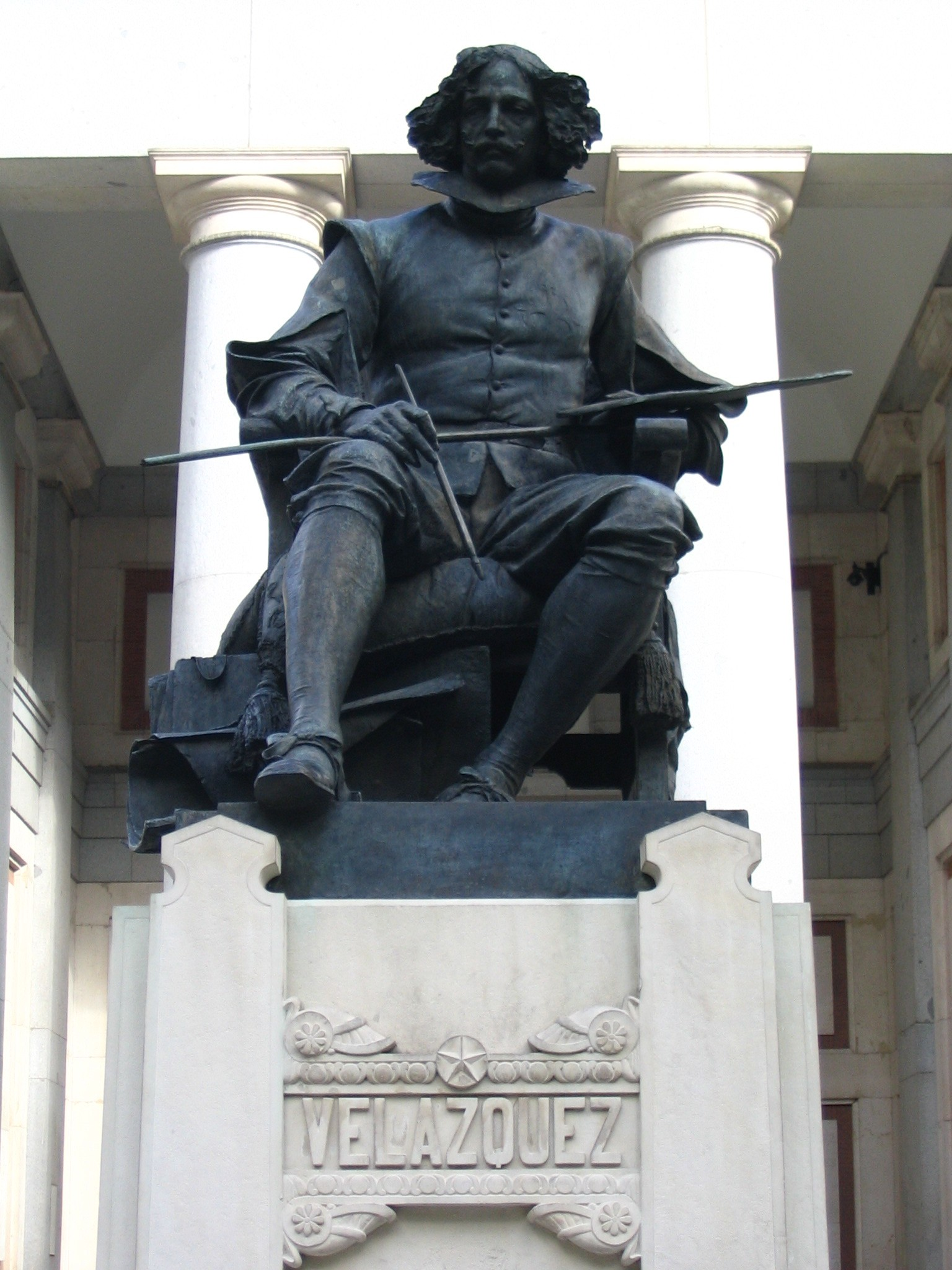
Statue of Diego Velázquez by Aniceto Marinas (1899), dominating the Velázquez entrance

Between 1873 and 1900, the Prado helped decorate city halls, new universities, and churches. During the Second Spanish Republic from 1931 to 1936, the focus was on developing provincial museums. During the Spanish Civil War, upon the recommendation of the League of Nations, the museum staff removed 353 paintings, 168 drawings and the Dauphin's Treasure and sent the art to Valencia, then later to Girona, and finally to Geneva. The art had to be returned across French territory in night trains to the museum upon the commencement of World War II. During the early years of the dictatorship of Francisco Franco, many paintings were sent to embassies.

The main building was enlarged with pavilions in the rear between 1900 and 1960. The next enlargement was the incorporation of two buildings (nearby but not adjacent) into the institutional structure of the museum: the Casón del Buen Retiro, which is equipped to display up to 400 paintings and which housed the bulk of the 20th-century art from 1971 to 1997, and the Salón de Reinos (Throne building), formerly the Army Museum.

In 1993, an extension proposed by the Prado's director at the time, Felipe Garin, was quickly abandoned after a wave of criticism. In the late 1990s, a $14 million roof work forced the Velázquez masterpiece Las Meninas to change galleries twice. In 1998, the Prado annex in the nearby Casón del Buen Retiro closed for a $10 million two-year overhaul that included three new underground levels. In 2007, the museum finally executed Rafael Moneo's project to expand its exposition room to 16,000 square meters, hoping to increase the yearly number of visitors from 1.8 million to 2.5 million.

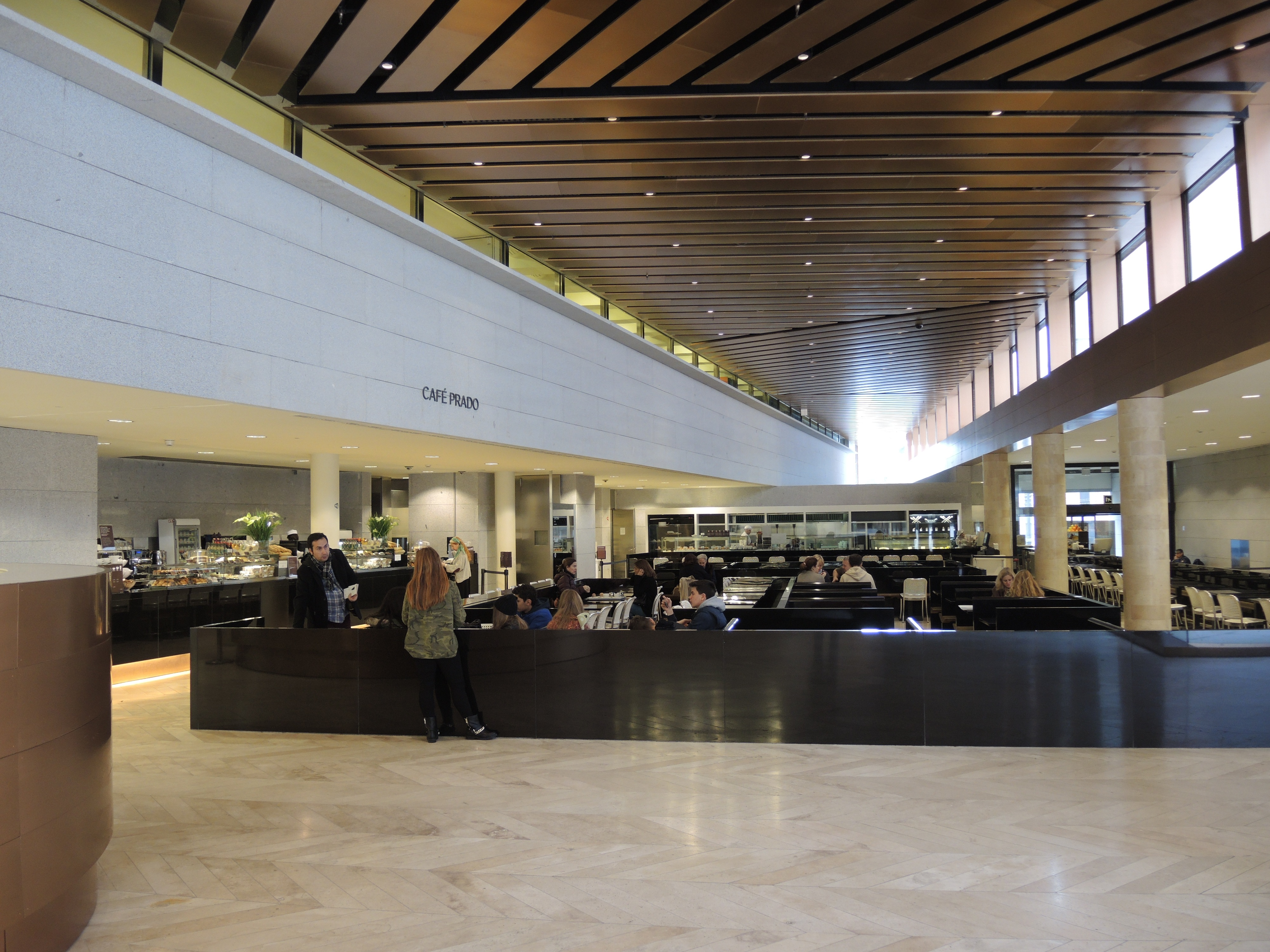
The cafeteria in the underground extension by Rafael Moneo

A glass-roofed and wedge-shaped foyer now contains the museum's shops and cafeteria, removing them from the main building to make more room for galleries. The 16th-century Cloister of Jerónimo has been removed stone by stone to make foundations for increased stability of surrounding buildings and will be re-assembled in the new museum's extension. Hydraulic jacks had to be used to prevent the basement walls from falling during construction. The enlargement is an underground building which connects the main building to another one entirely reconstructed.

In November 2016, it was announced that British architect Norman Foster, in a joint project with Carlos Rubio Carvajal, is to renovate the Hall of Realms, which once formed part of the Buen Retiro palace and transform it into a $32 million extension of the Prado. The museum announced the selection of Foster and Rubio after a jury reviewed the proposals of the eight competition finalists—including David Chipperfield, Rem Koolhaas and Eduardo Souto de Moura— who had already been shortlisted from an initial list of 47 international teams of architects. The building was acquired by the Prado in 2015, after having served as an army museum until 2005. The project is designed to give the Prado about 61,500 square feet of additional available space, of which about 27,000 square feet will be used to exhibit works. Only in 2021, the Spanish government approved the plans and awarded the project 36 million euros.

== Historic structure ==
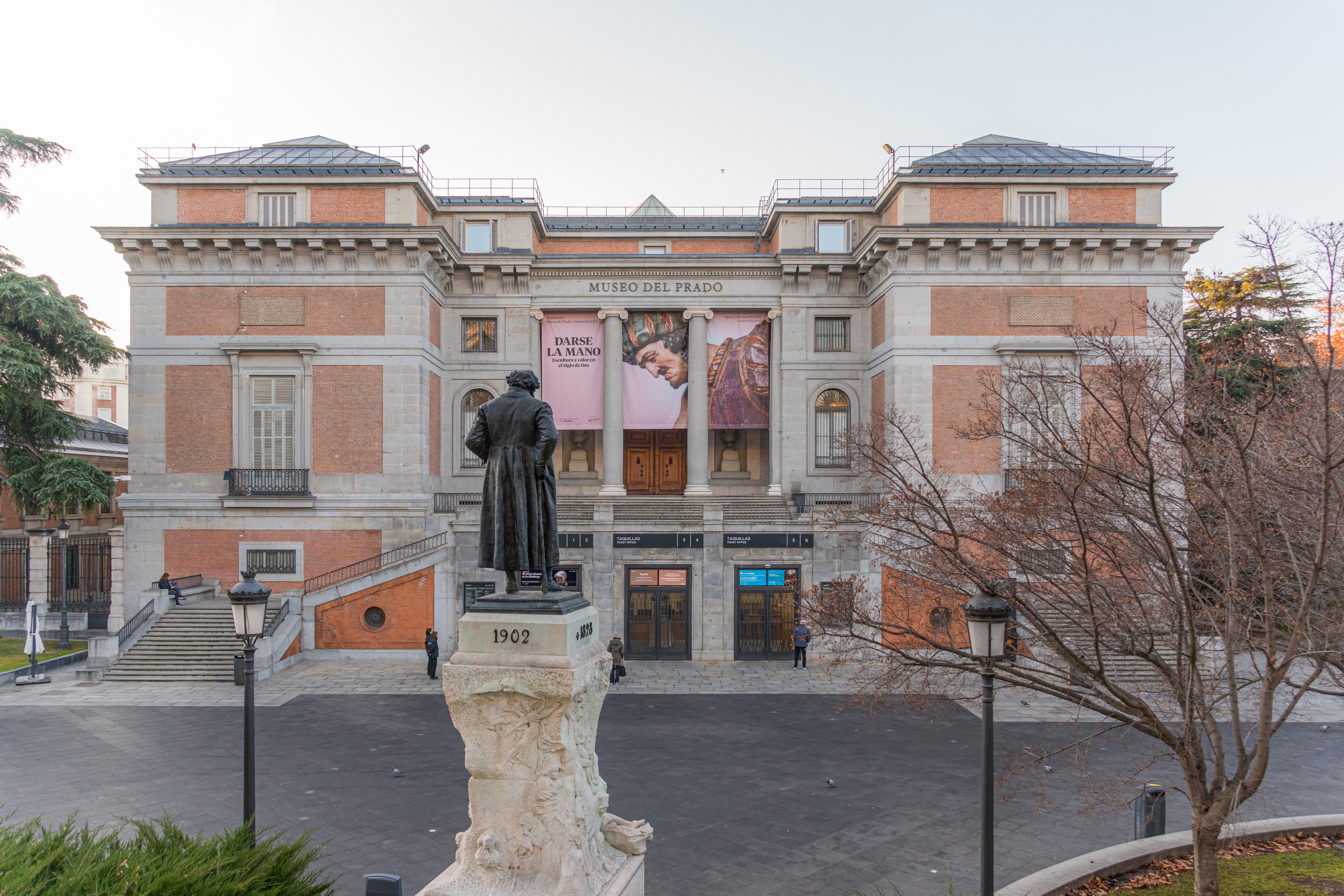
North façade (Goya entrance)

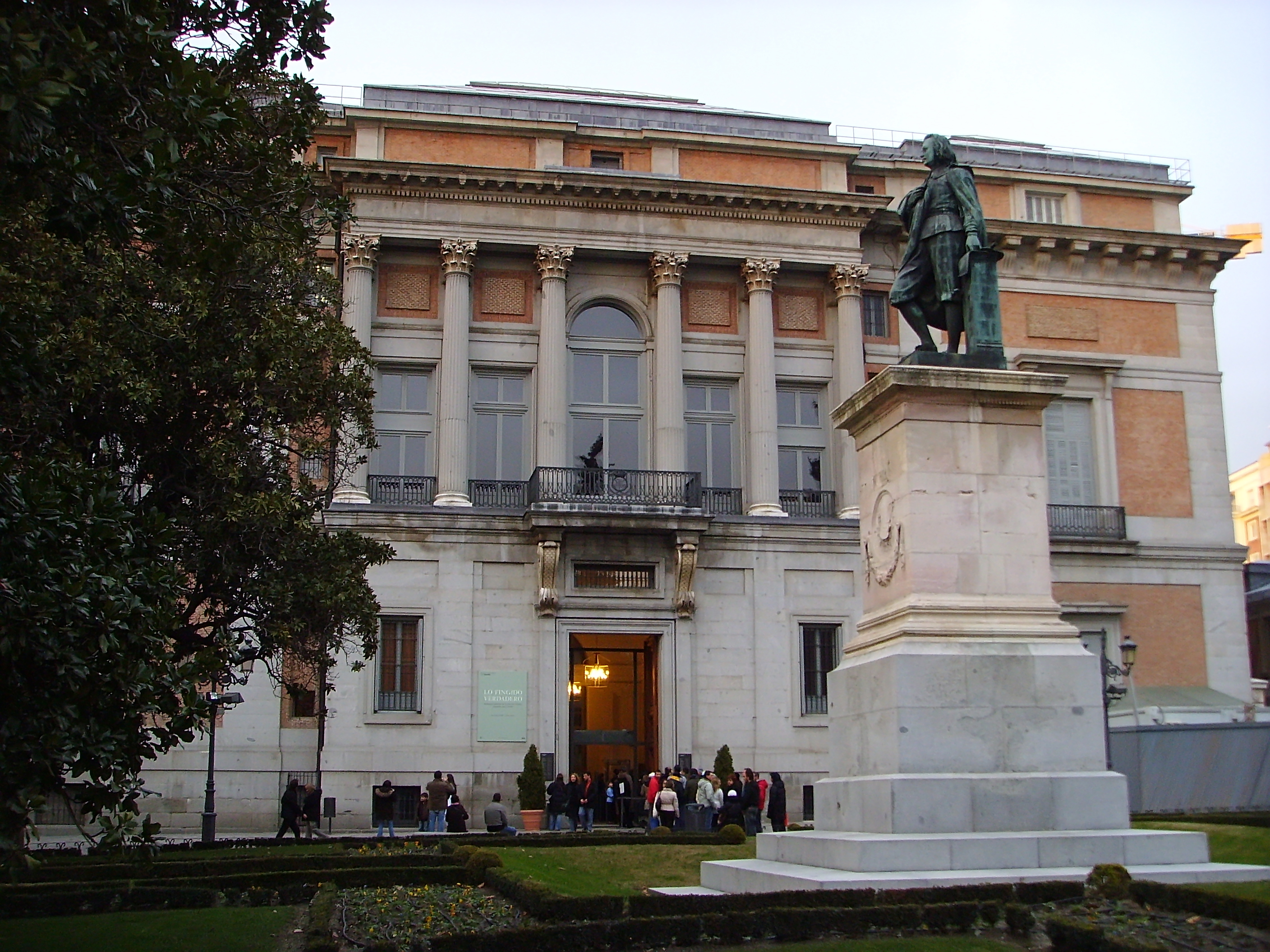
South façade (Murillo entrance)

The Prado Museum building is one of the buildings constructed during the reign of Charles III (Carlos III) as part of a grandiose building scheme designed to bestow upon Madrid a monumental urban space. The building was initially conceived by José Moñino y Redondo, count of Floridablanca, and was commissioned in 1785 by Charles III for the reurbanización of the Paseo del Prado. To this end, Charles III called on one of his favorite architects, Juan de Villanueva, author also of the nearby Botanical Garden and the City Hall of Madrid.

The prado ("meadow") that was where the museum now stands gave its name to the area, the Salón del Prado (later Paseo del Prado), and to the museum itself upon nationalisation. Work on the building stopped at the conclusion of Charles III's reign and throughout the Peninsular War and was only initiated again during the reign of Charles III's grandson, Ferdinand VII. The premises had been used as headquarters for the cavalry and a gunpowder-store for the Napoleonic troops based in Madrid during the war.

The next renovations that this museum is undergoing at the Hall of Realms are conducted by British architect Norman Foster. This renovation was approved in June 2020 and is expected to take a minimum of four years.

== Collection highlights ==
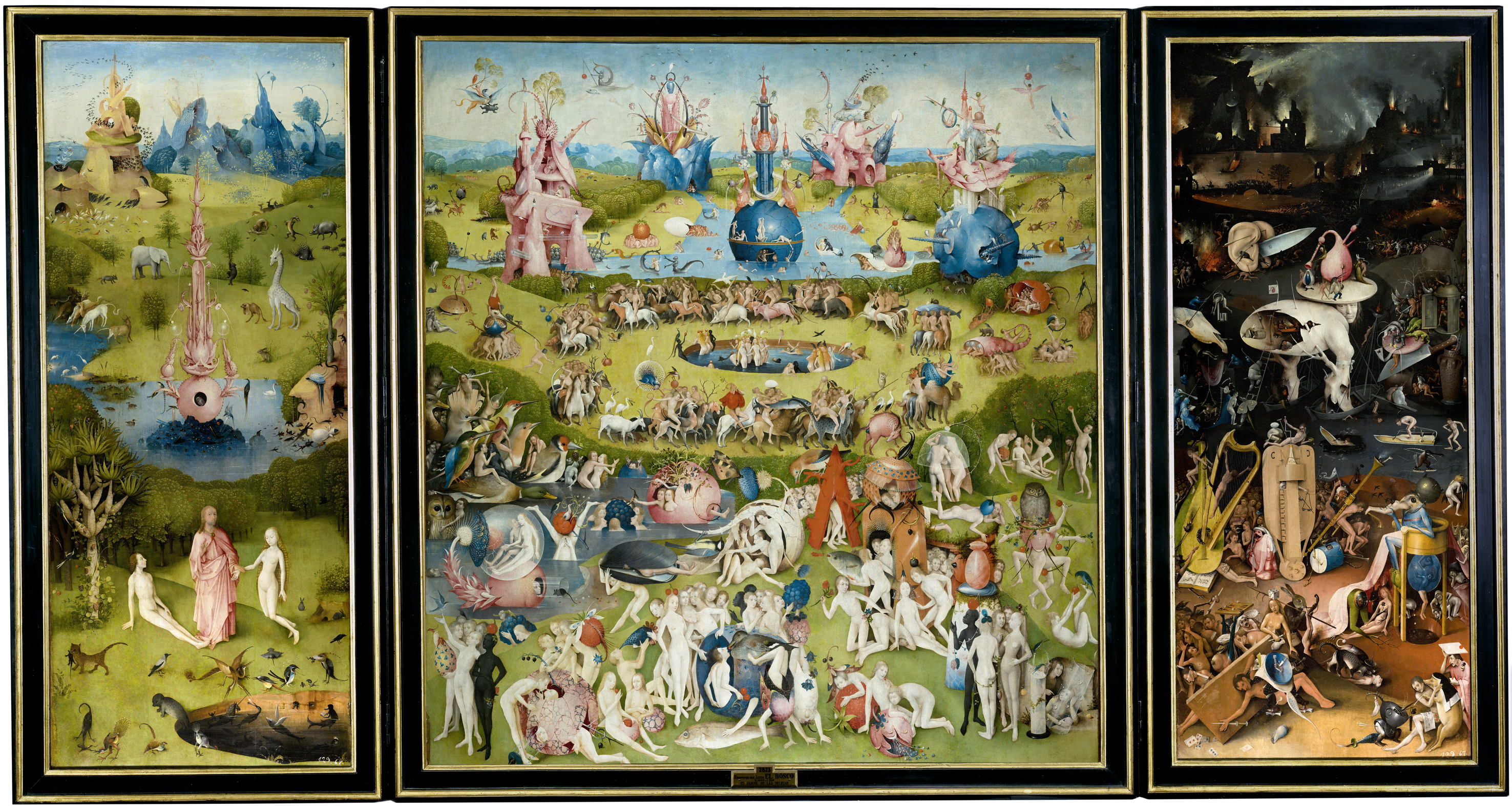
Hieronymus Bosch, The Garden of Earthly Delights, between 1480 and 1505

Diego Velázquez, Las Meninas, between 1656 and 1657

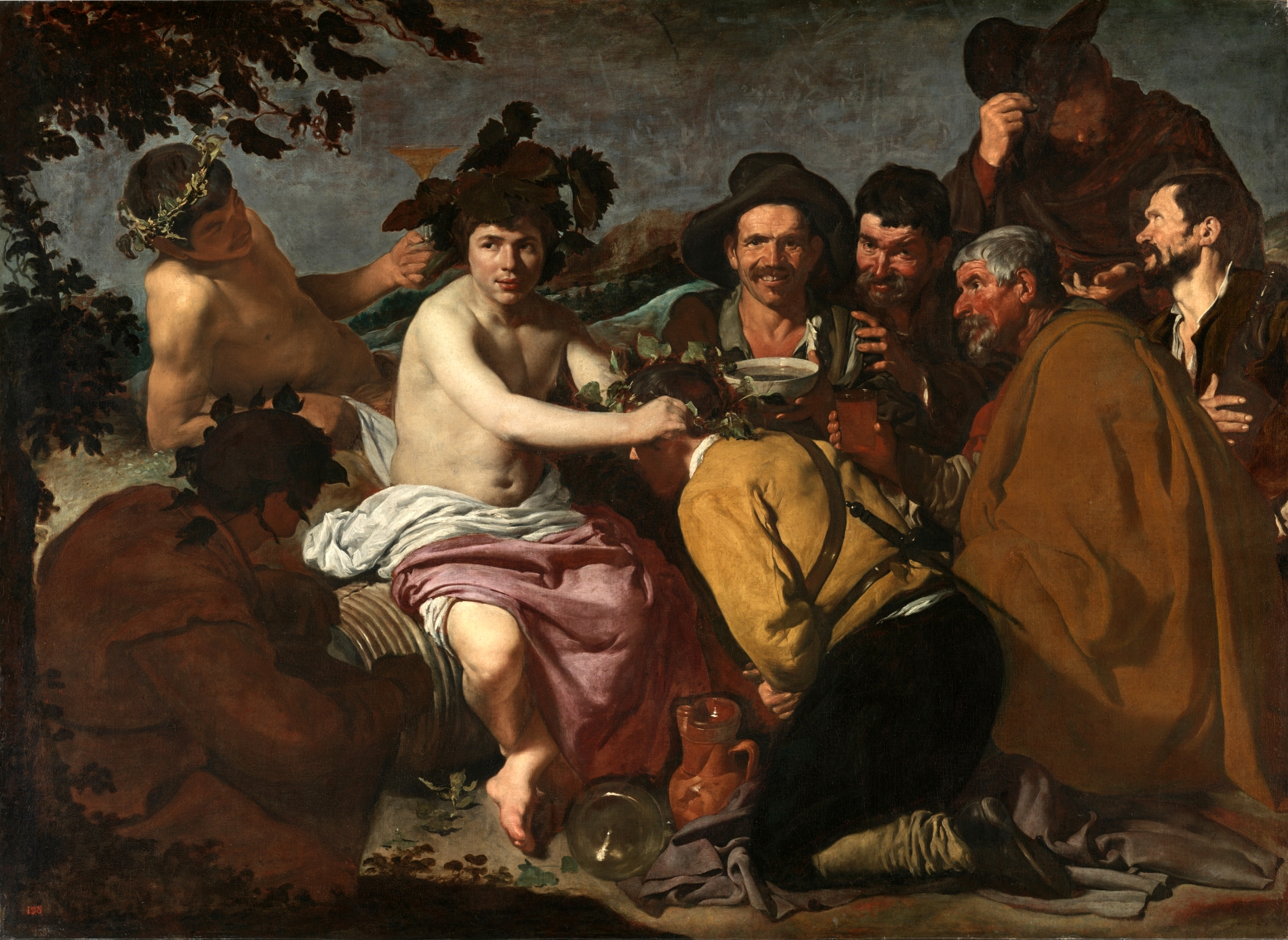
Diego Velázquez, The Triumph of Bacchus, 1628–29

=== Selected works ===
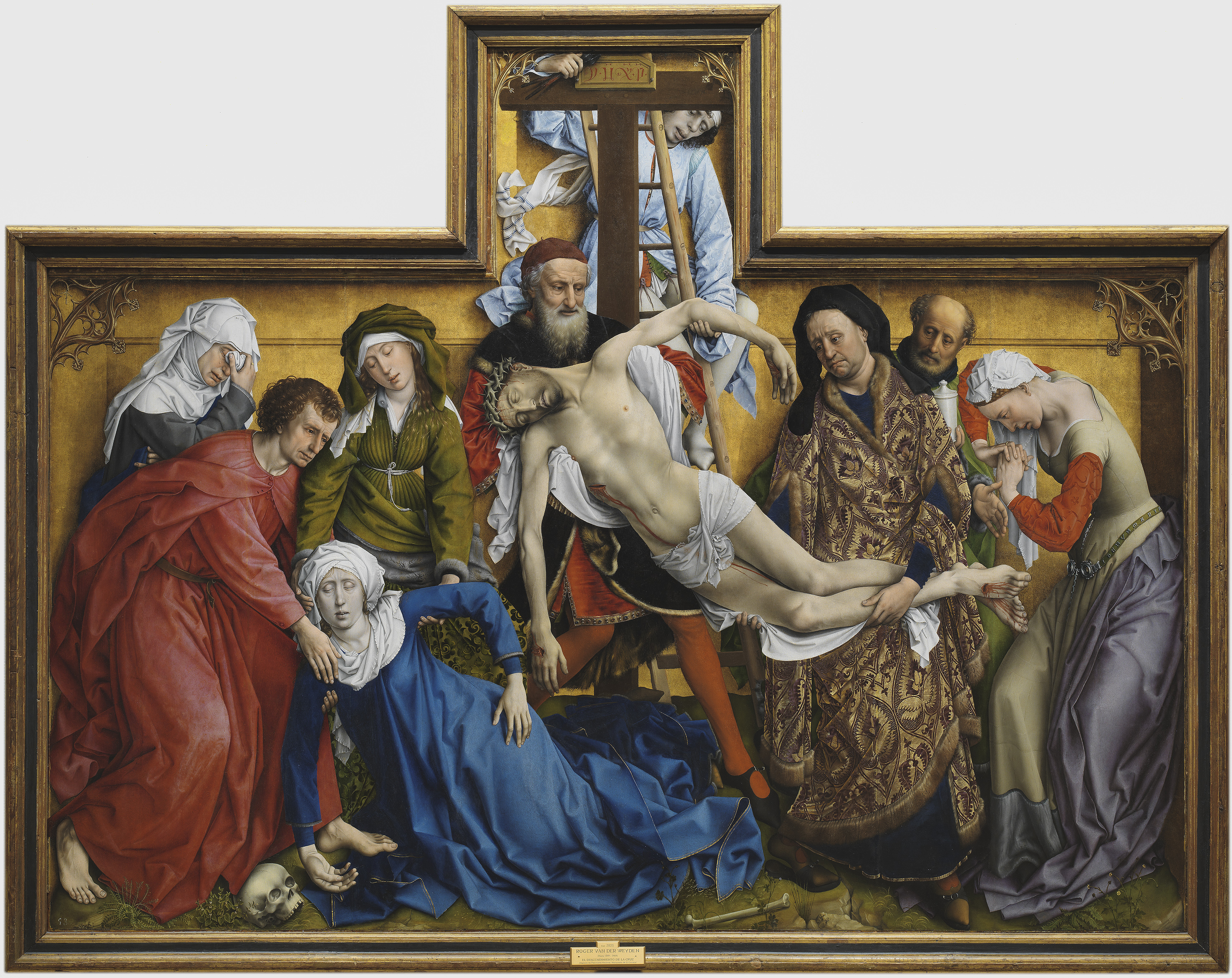
Rogier van der Weyden, The Descent from the Cross, c. 1435

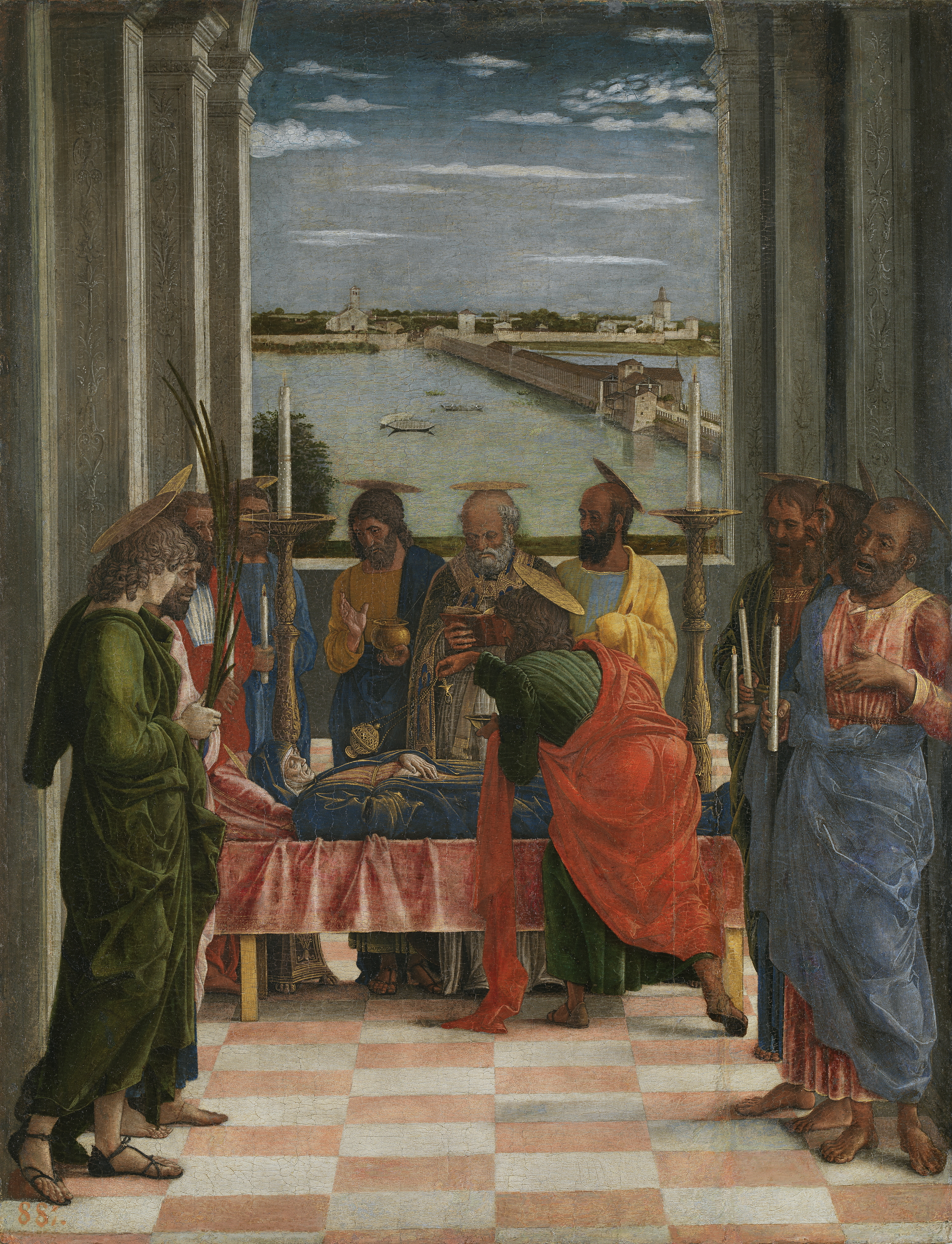
Andrea Mantegna, Death of the Virgin, c. 1461

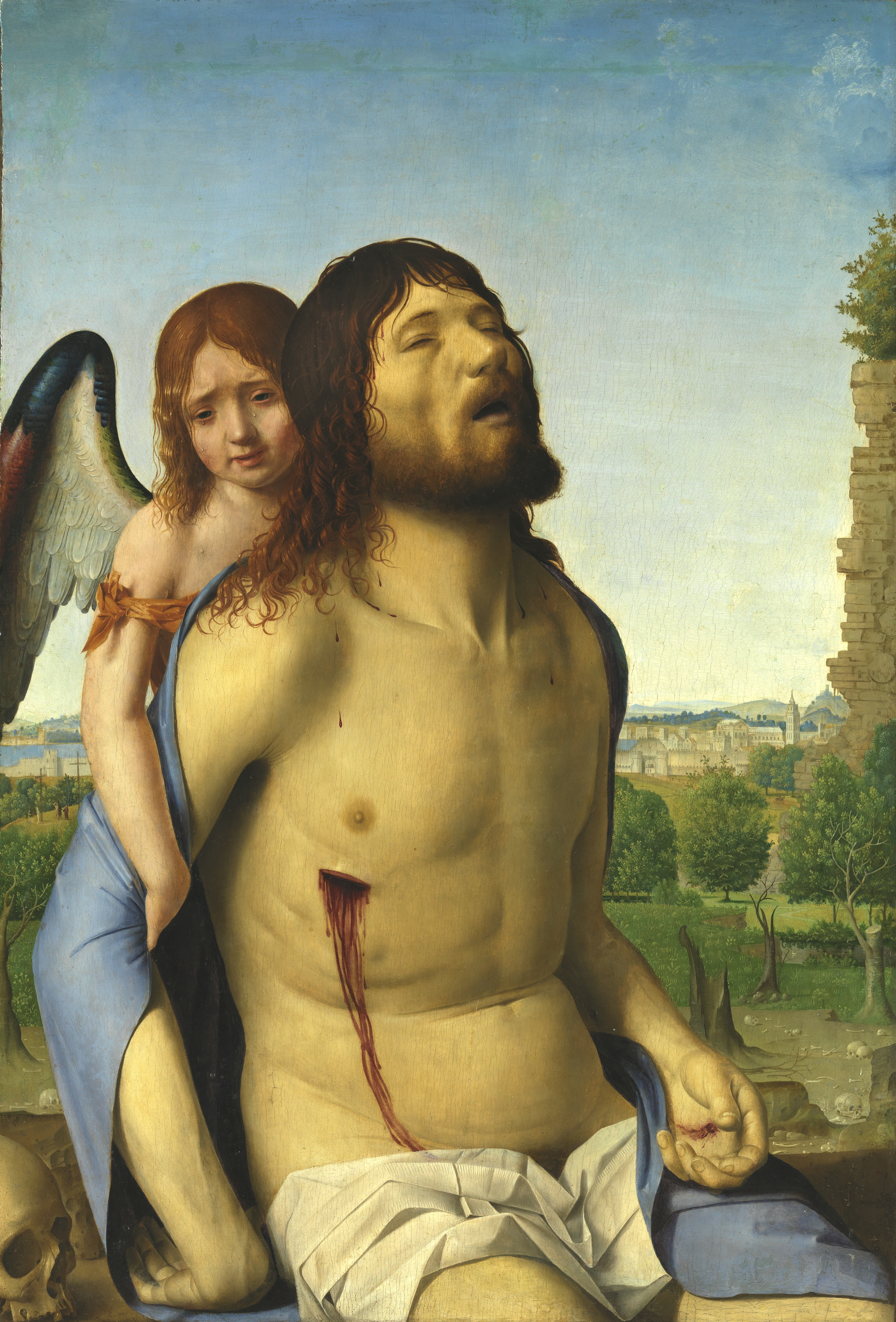
Antonello da Messina, The Dead Christ Supported by an Angel, c. 1475

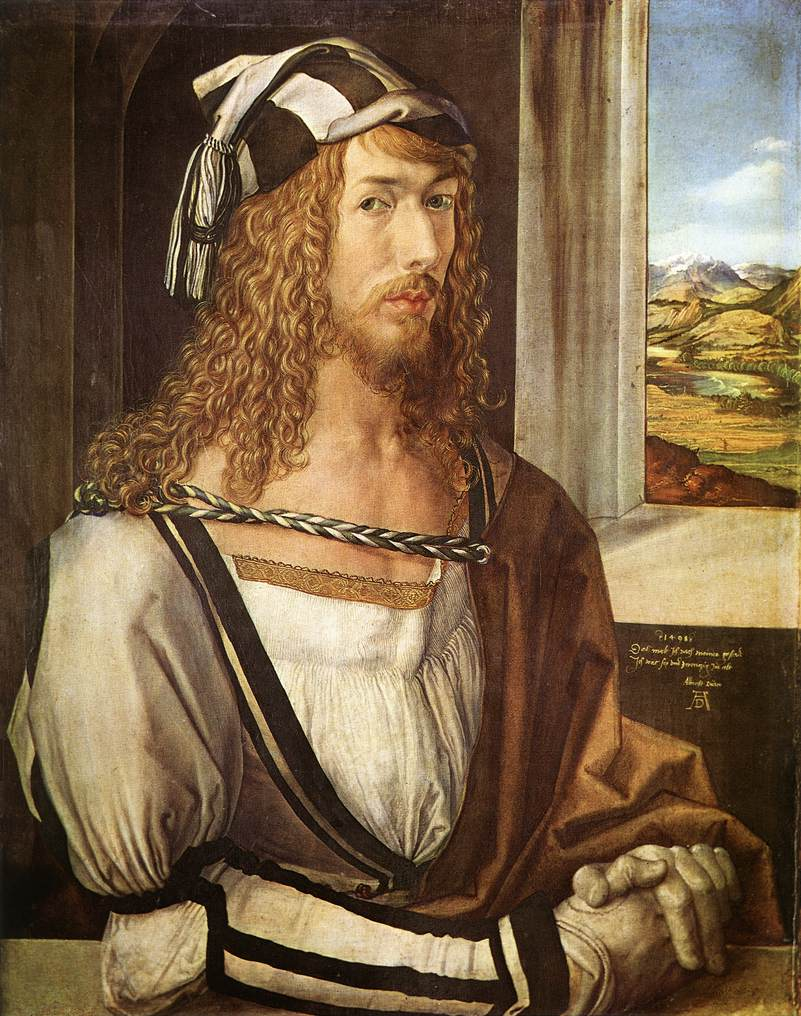
Albrecht Dürer Self-portrait, 1498

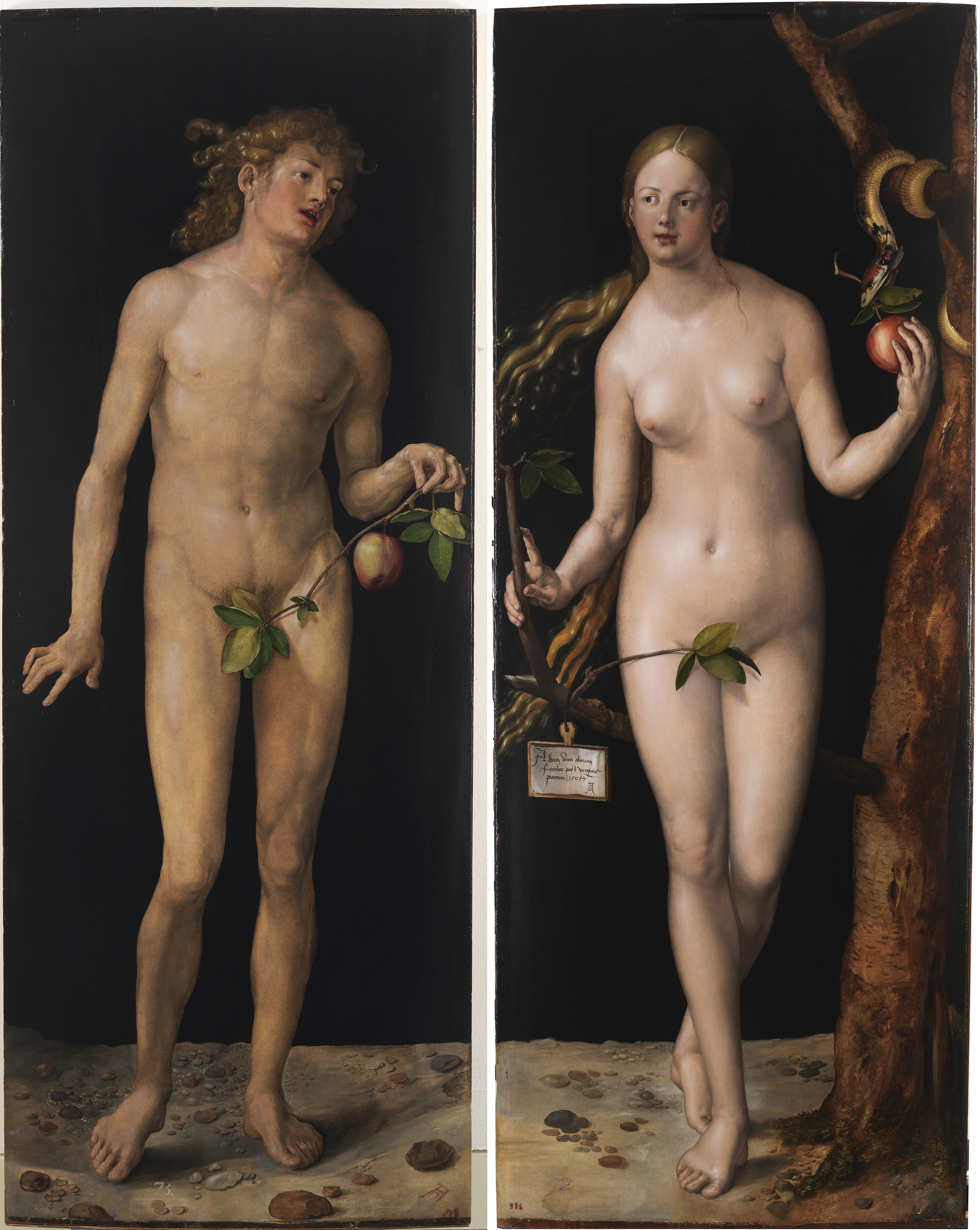
Albrecht Dürer Adam and Eve, 1507

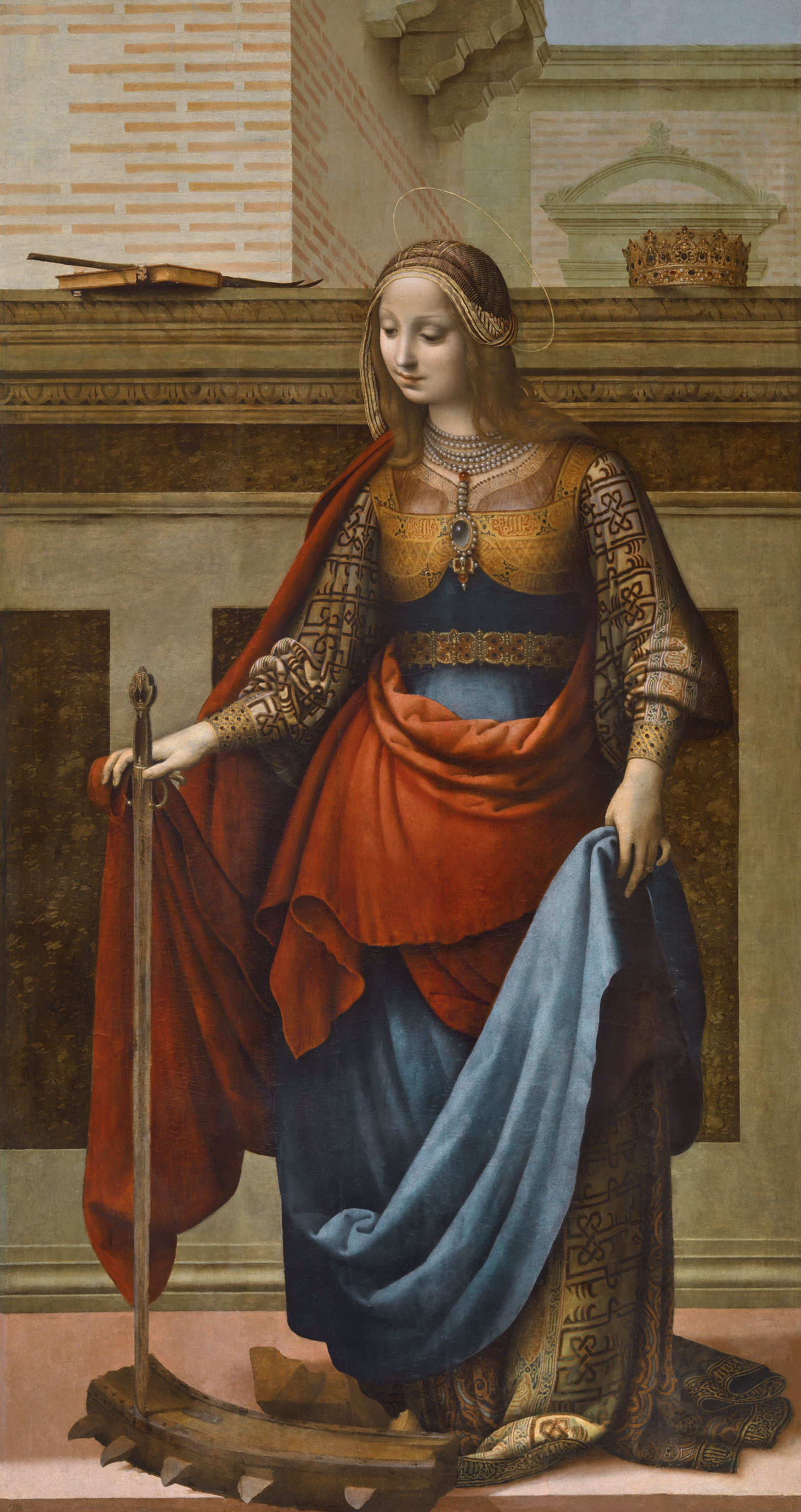
Fernando Yáñez de la Almedina, Saint Catherine of Alexandria, c. 1510

Raphael, Portrait of a Cardinal, c. 1510–11

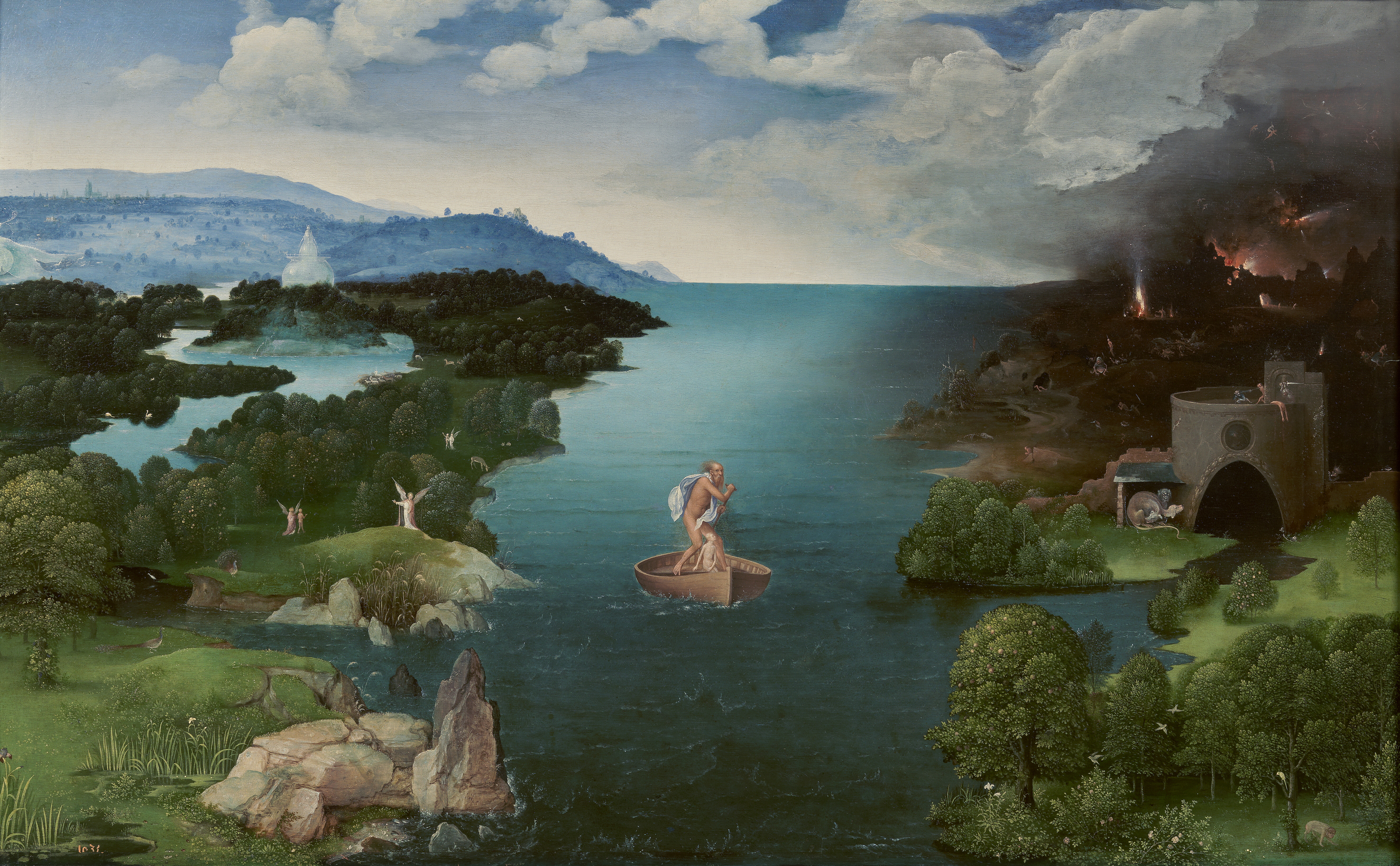
Joachim Patinir, Landscape with Charon Crossing the Styx, c. 1515–1524

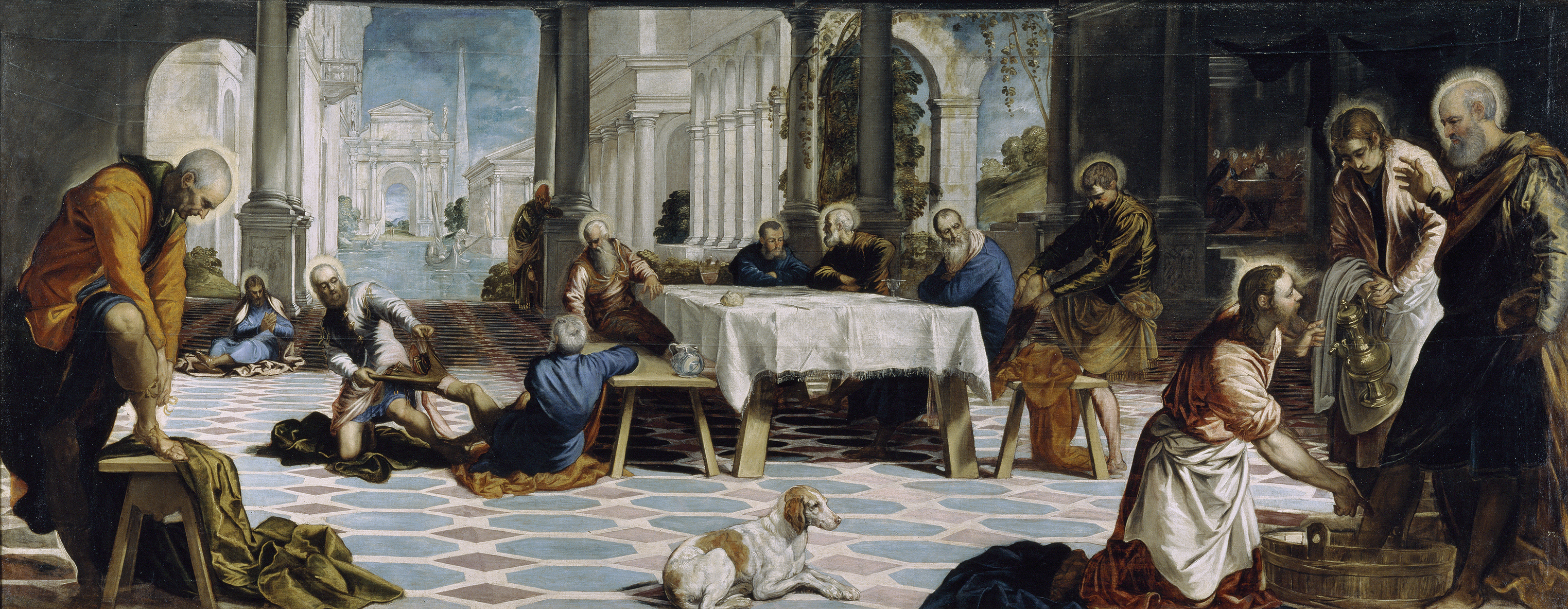
Tintoretto, Christ Washing the Disciples' Feet, c. 1518

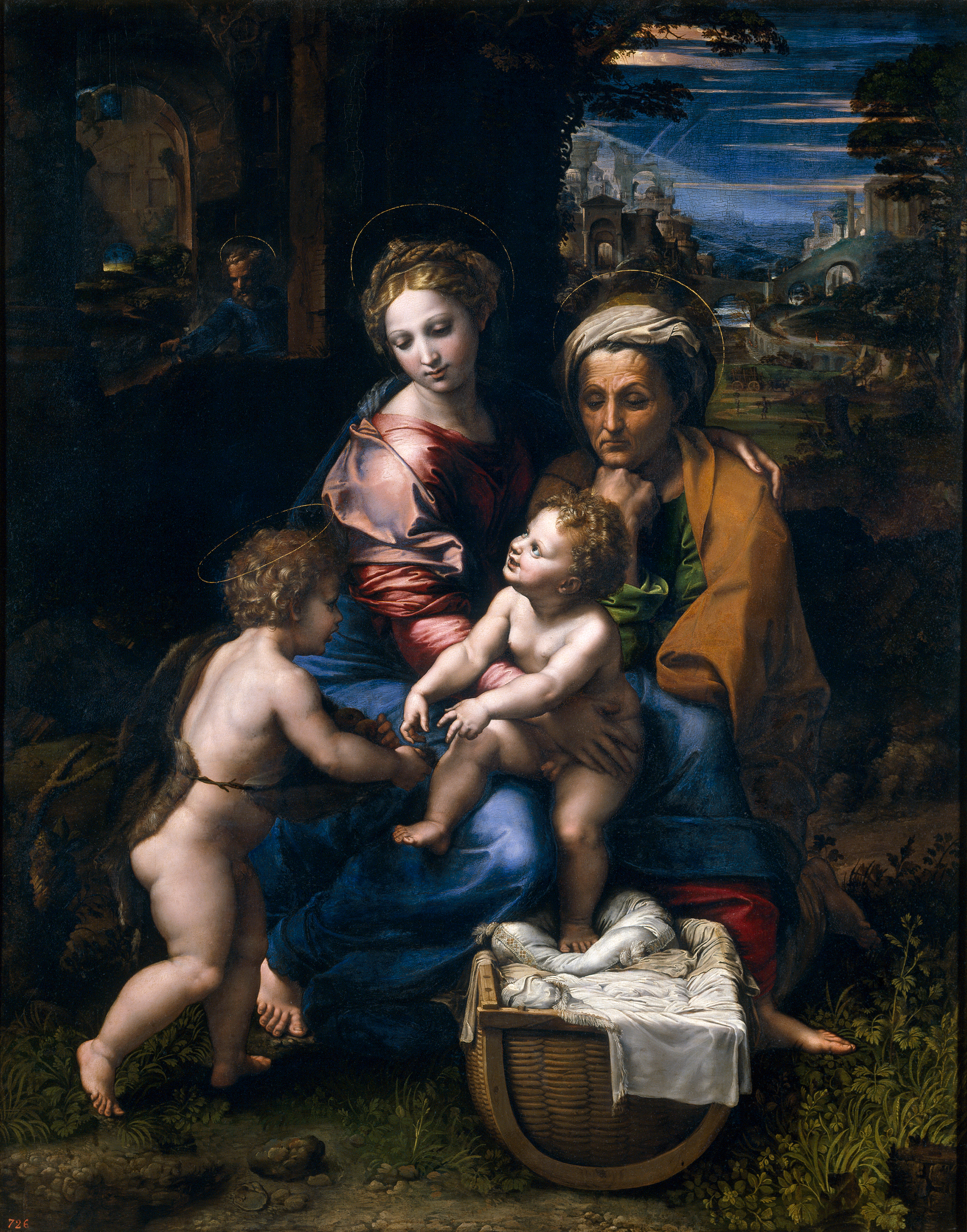
Raphael, The Pearl, c. 1518–1520

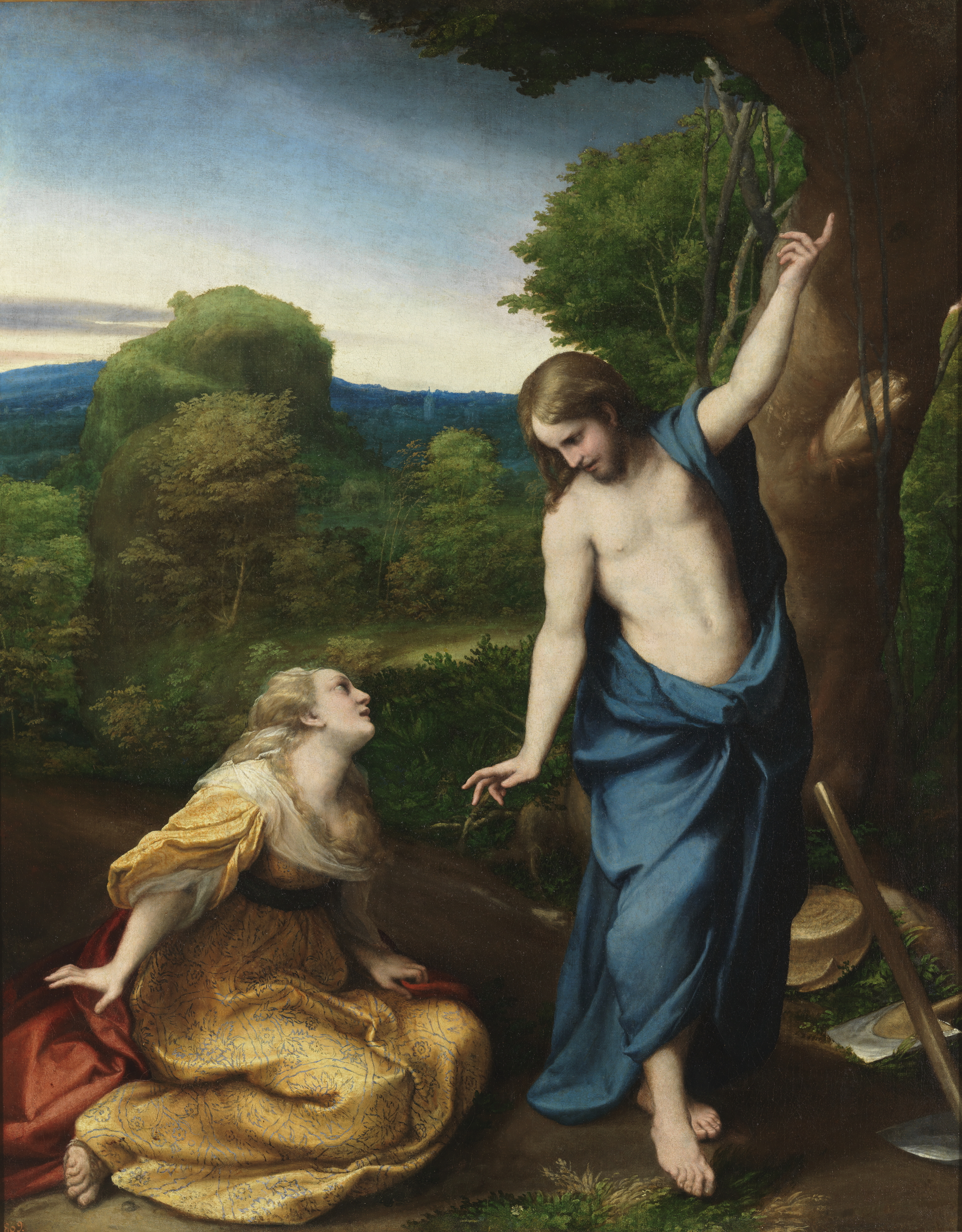
Correggio, Noli me tangere, c. 1525

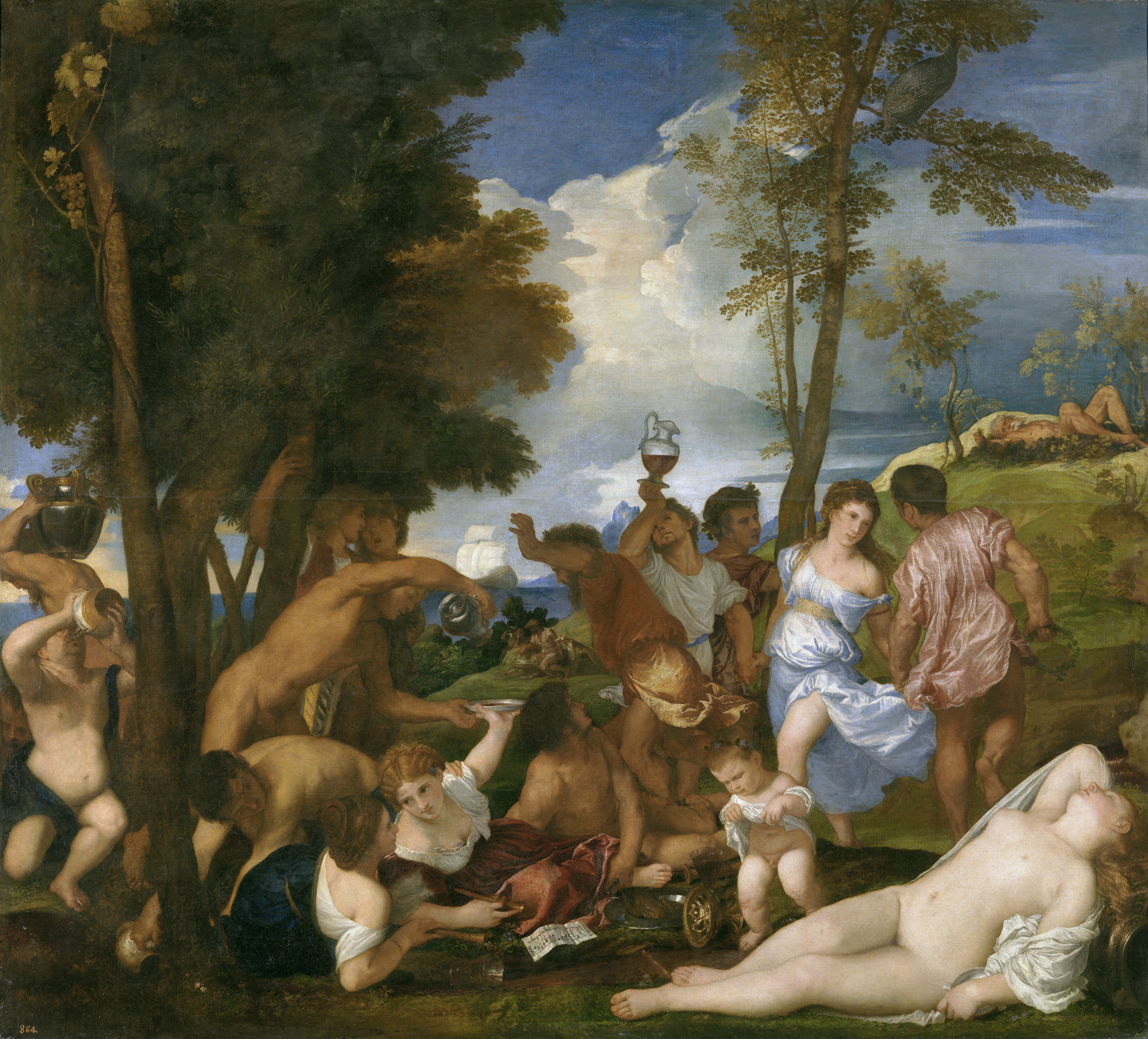
Titian, Bacchanal of the Andrians, c. 1523–1526

Titian, Equestrian Portrait of Charles V, c. 1548

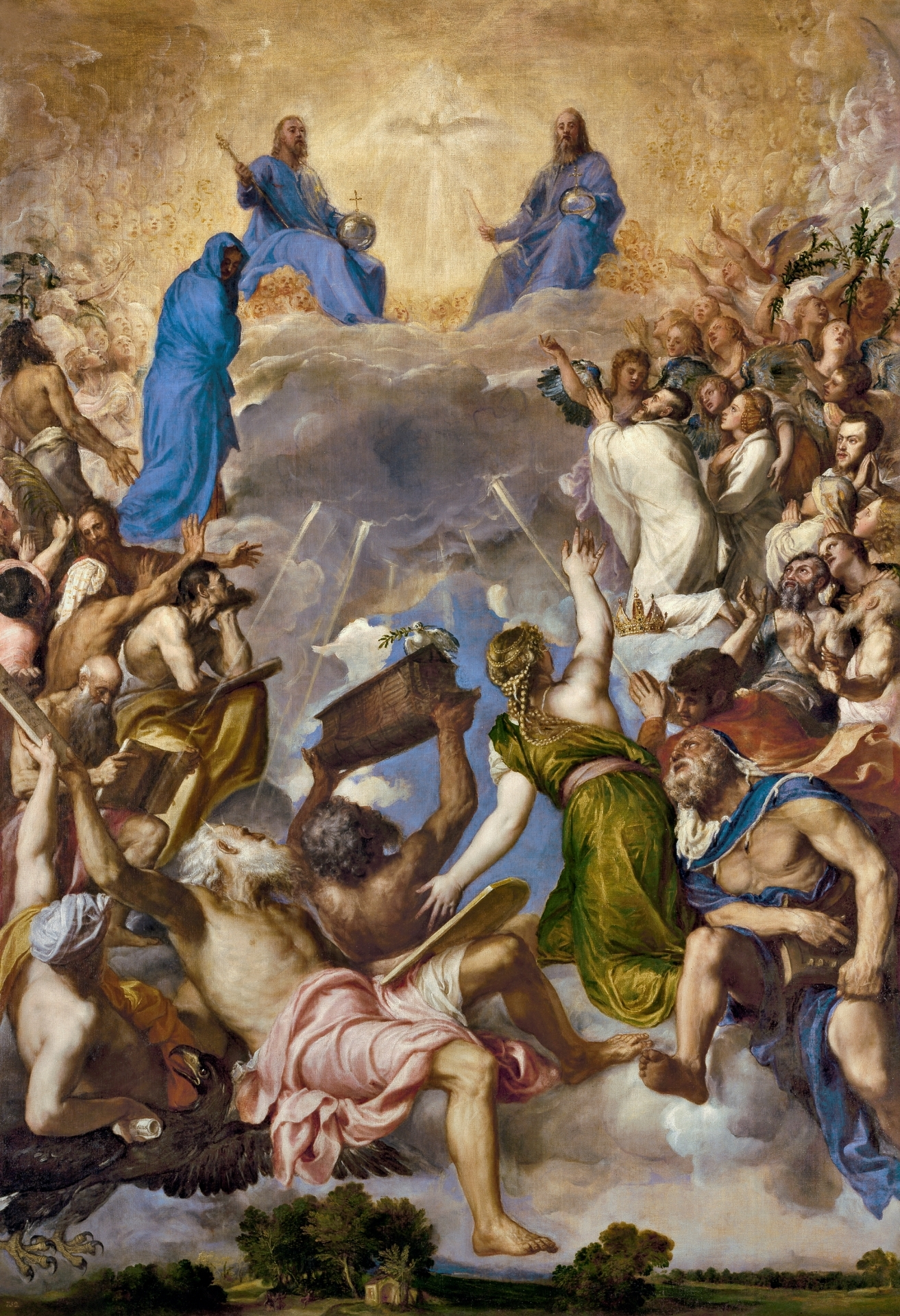
Titian, La Gloria (Titian), c. 1554

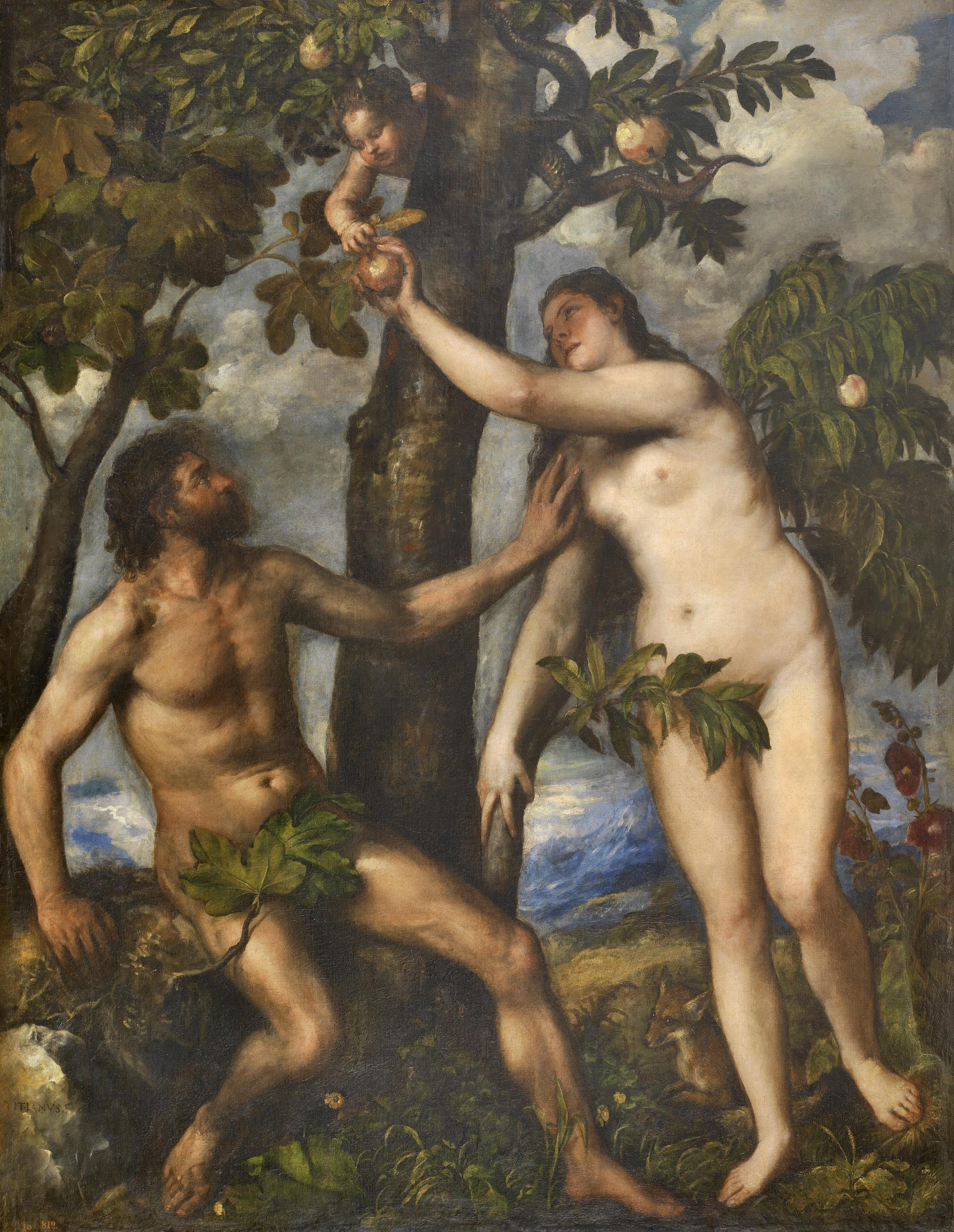
Titian, The Fall of Man, c. 1570

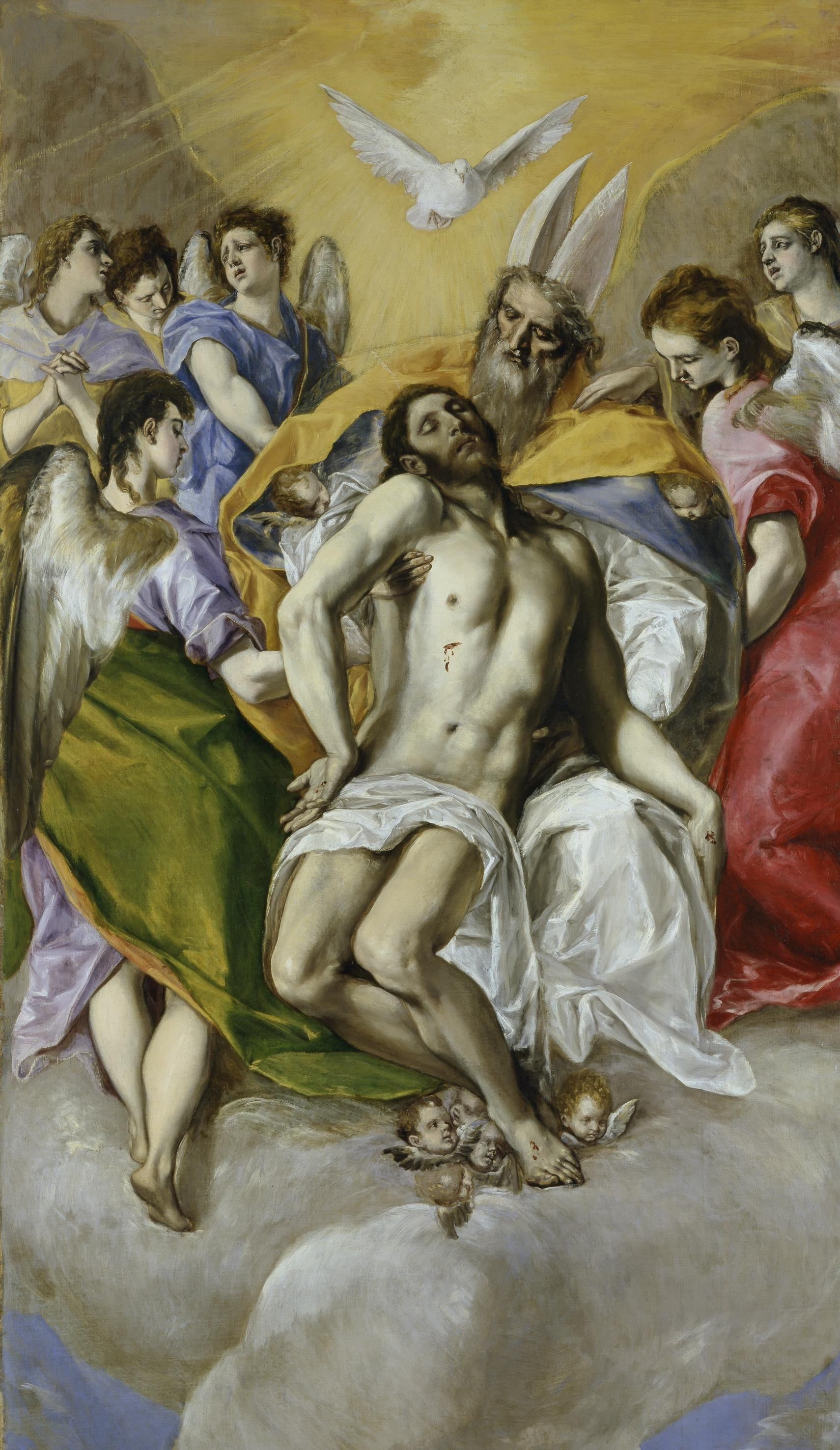
El Greco, Holy Trinity (El Greco), 1577–1579

El Greco, The Knight with His Hand on His Breast, c. 1580

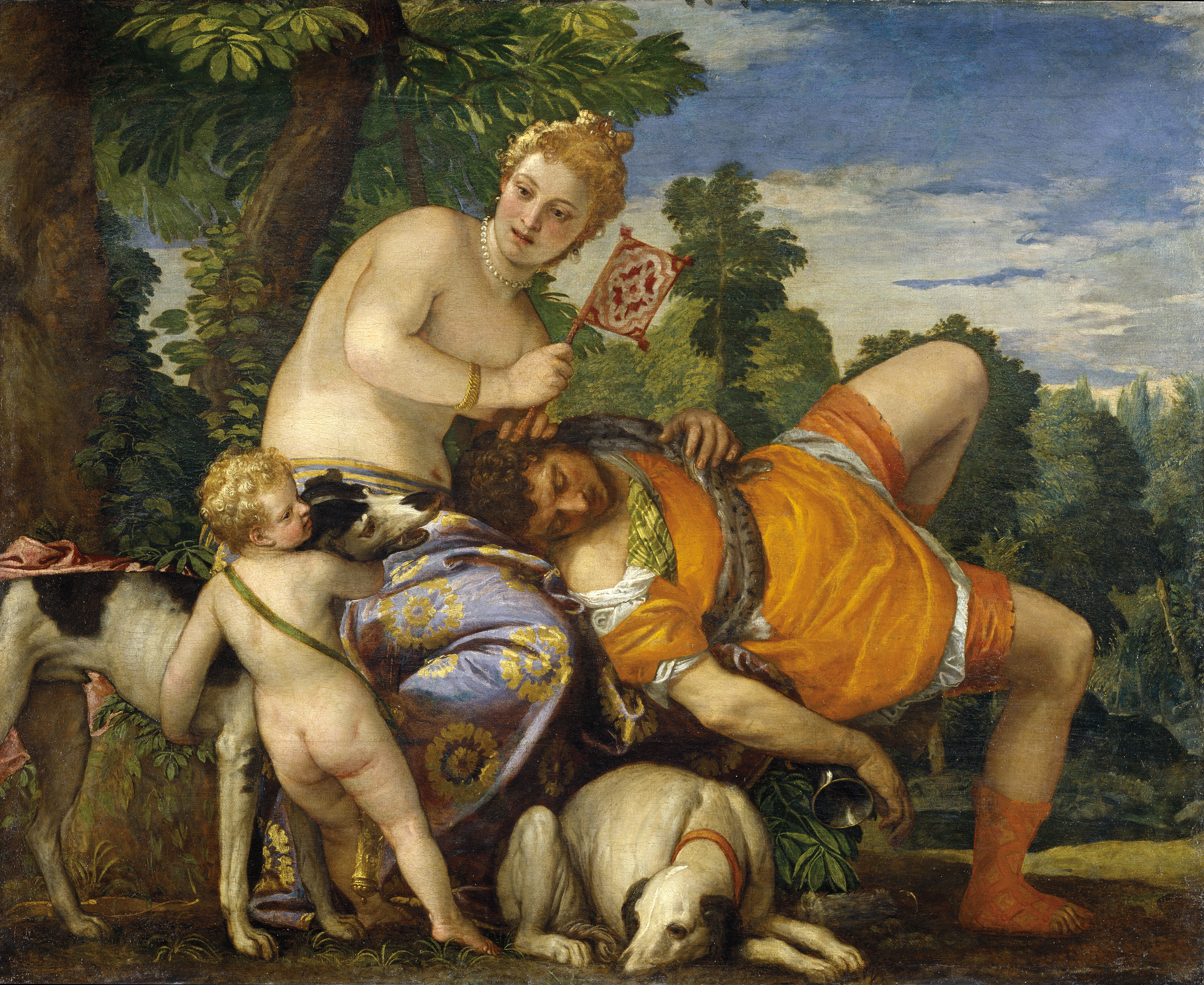
Paolo Veronese, Venus and Adonis, c. 1580

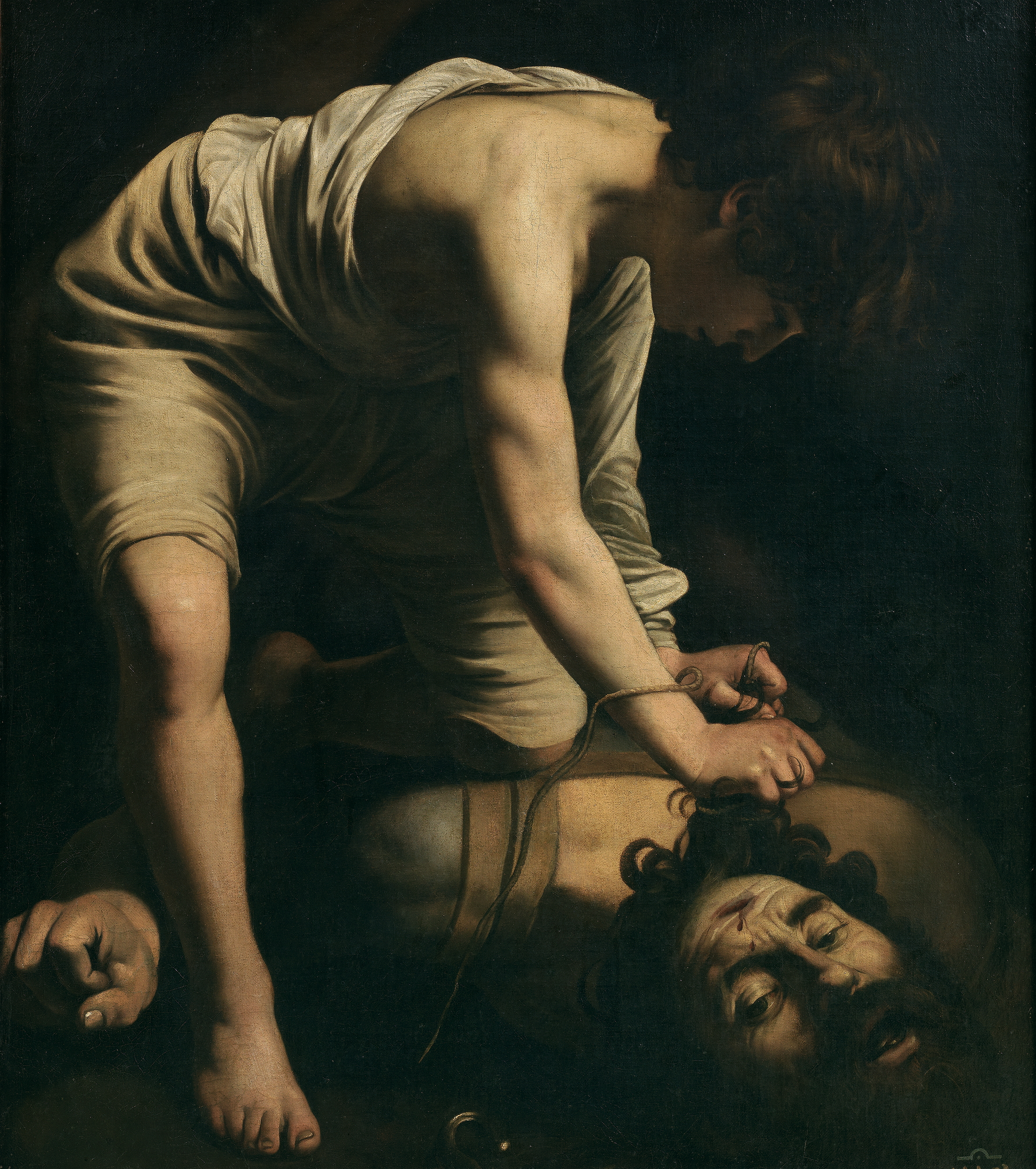
Caravaggio, David and Goliath, 1600

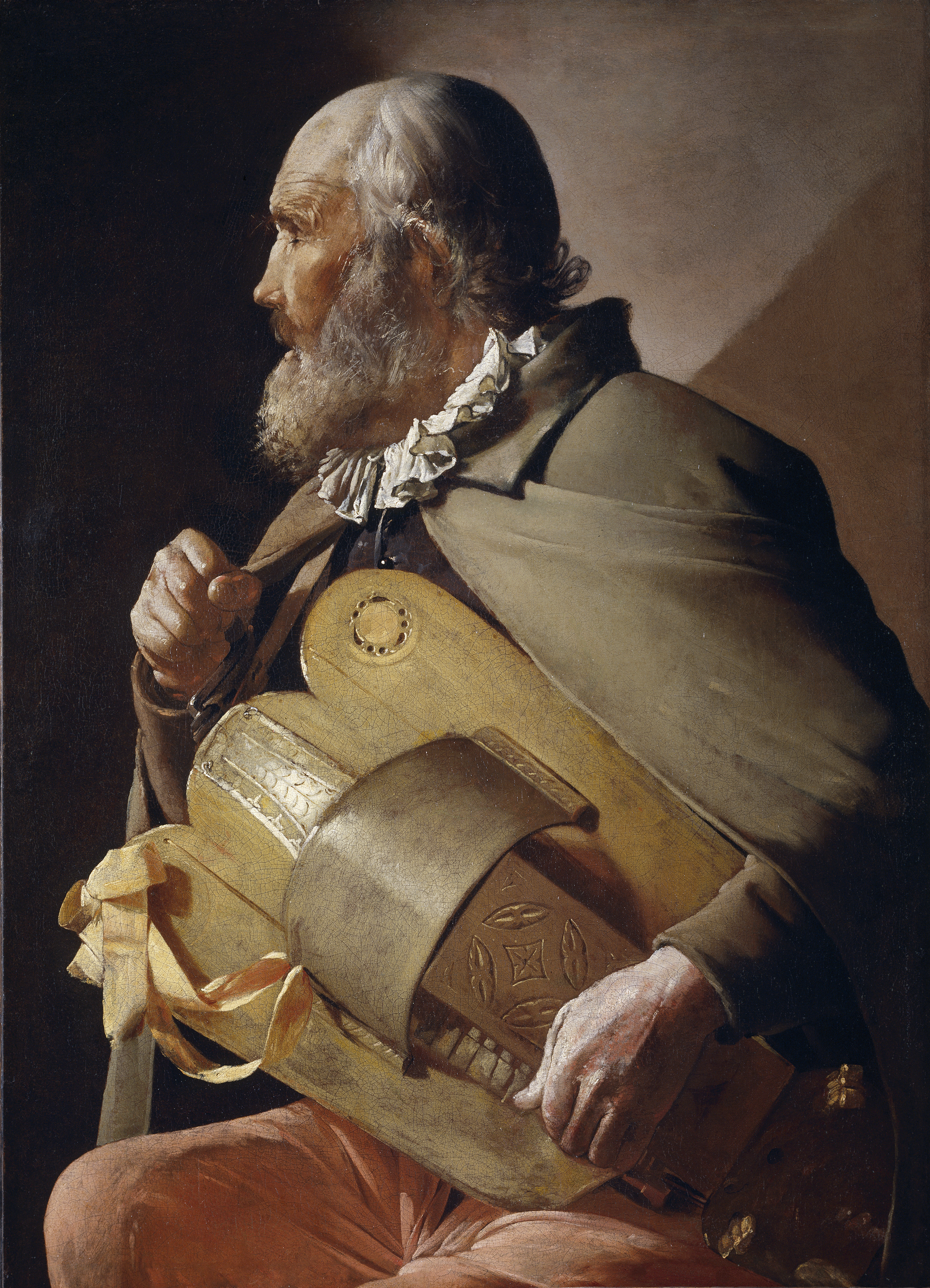
Georges de La Tour, Ciego tocando la zanfonía, 1610–1630

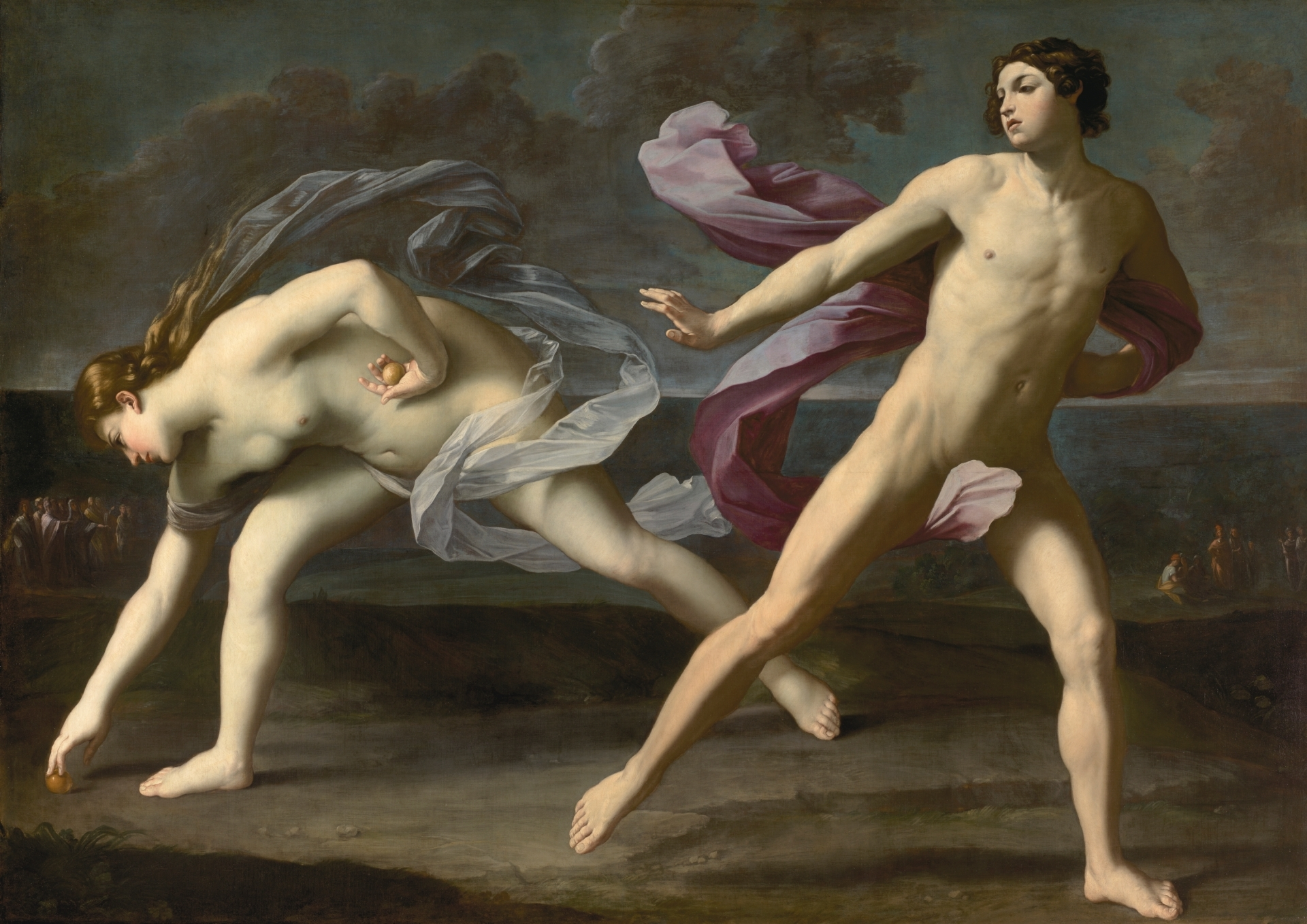
Guido Reni, Hipómenes y Atalanta, 1618–19

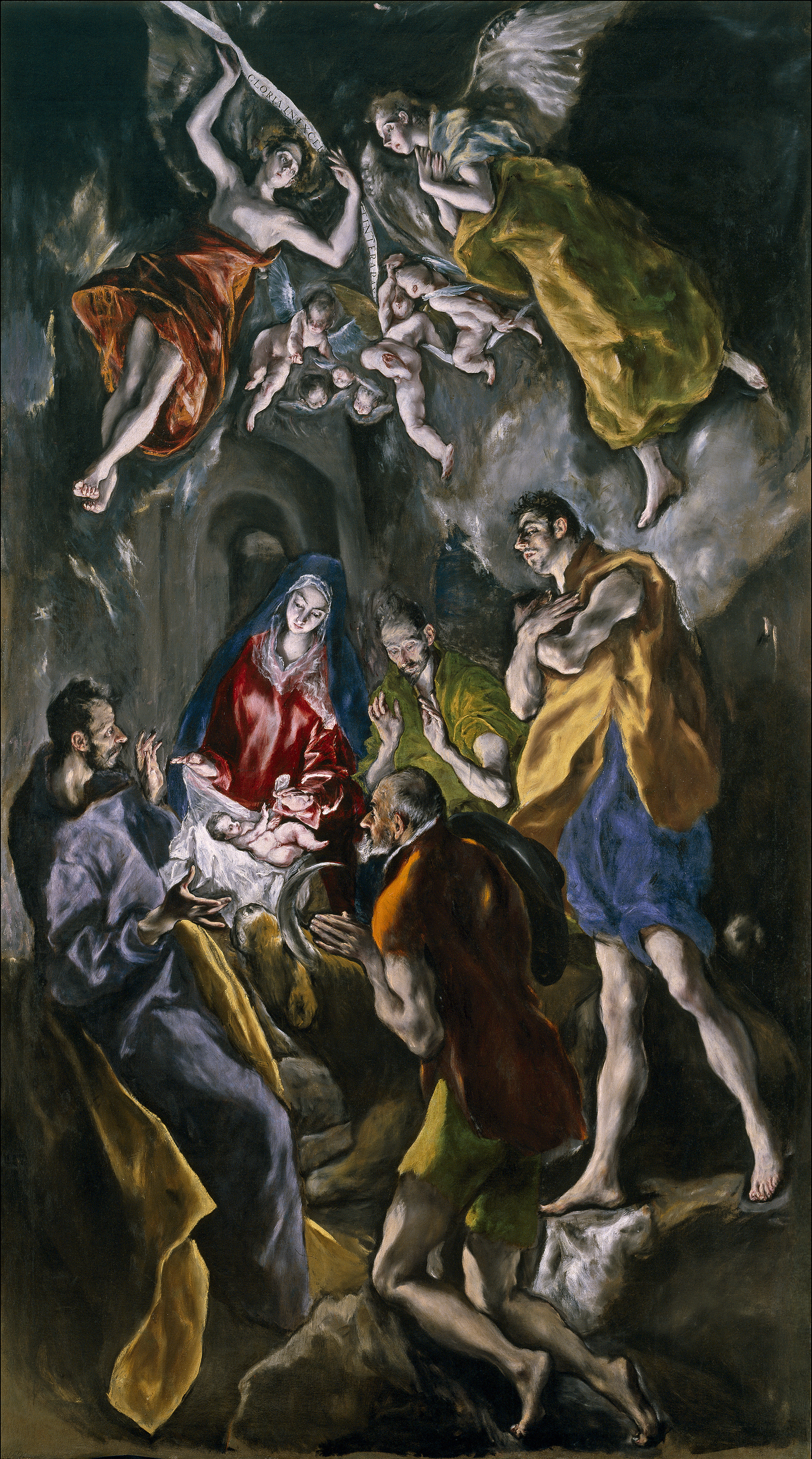
El Greco, The Adoration of the Shepherds (El Greco, Madrid), 1577–1579

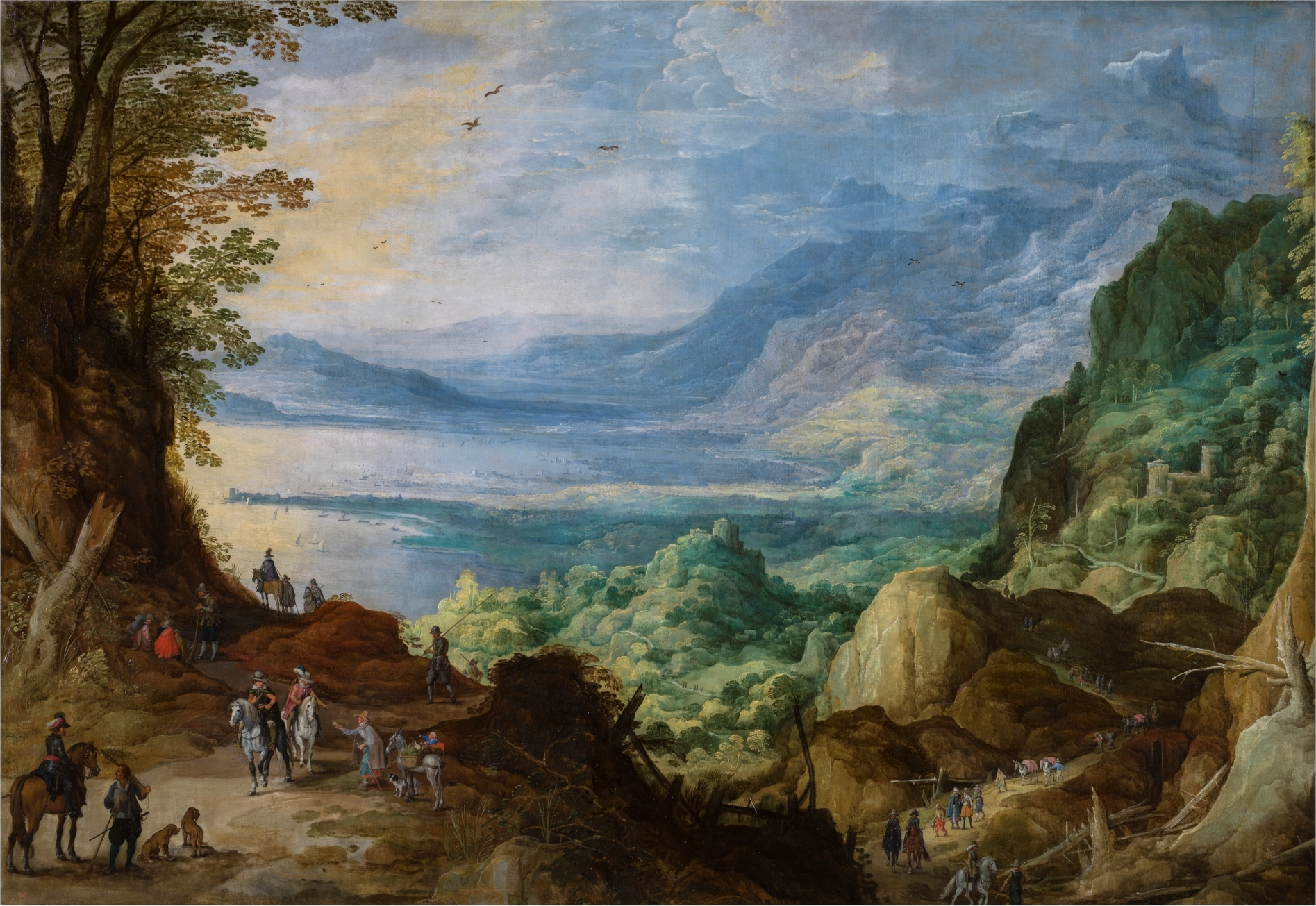
Joos de Momper, Landscape with Sea and Mountains, c. 1623

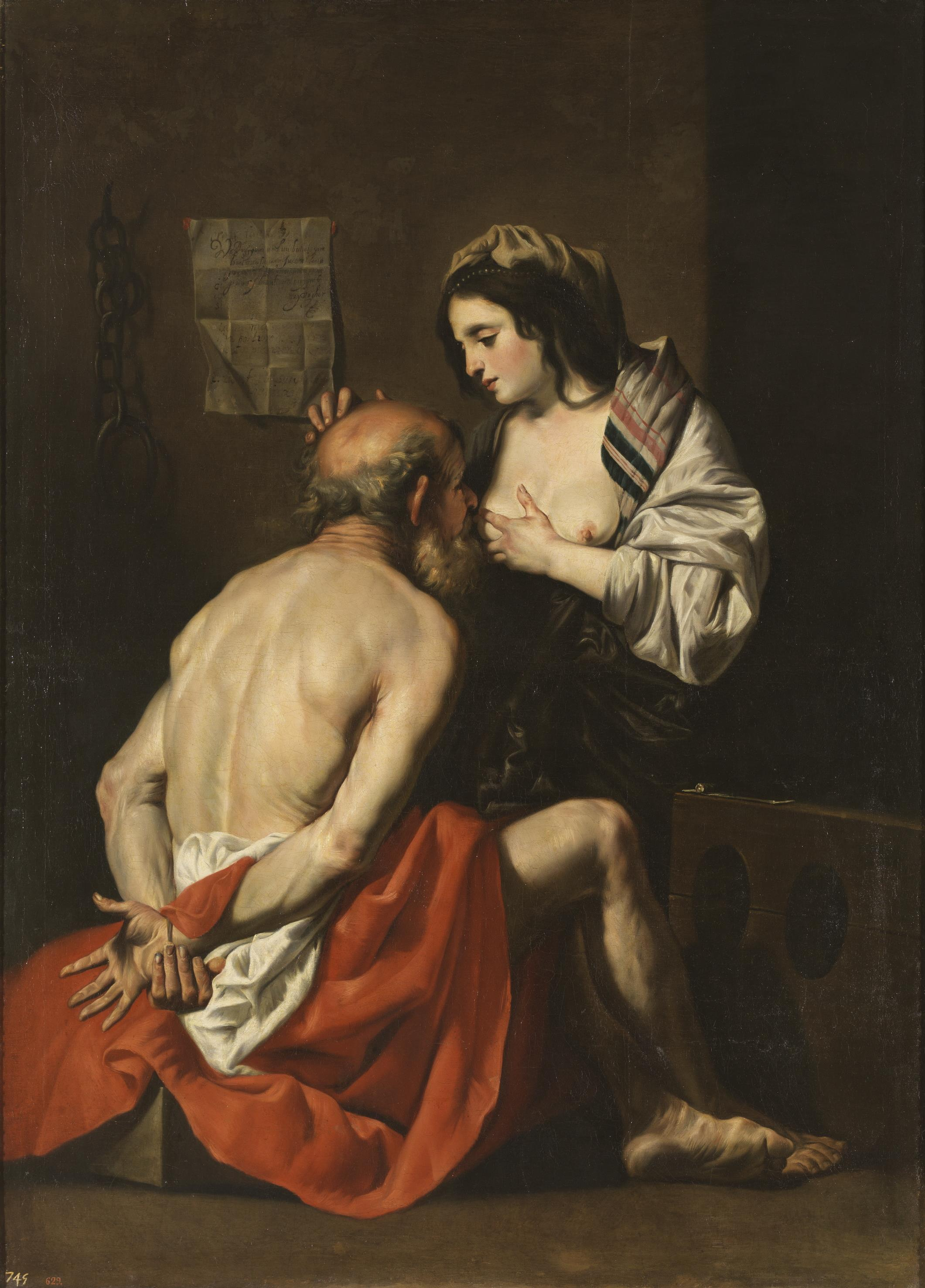
Gaspar de Crayer, Caritas Romana, c. 1625

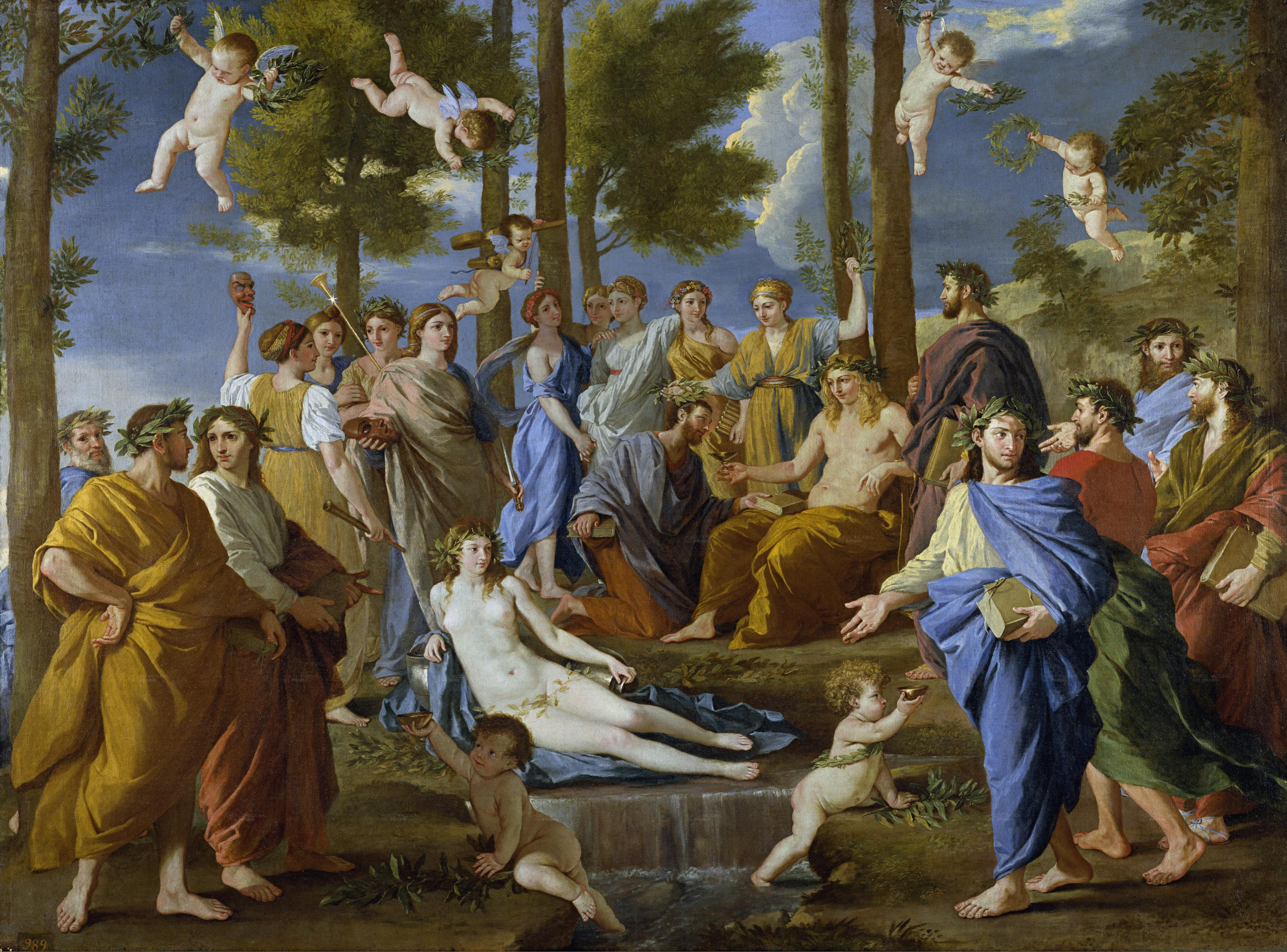
Nicolas Poussin, Parnassus, c. 1630–31

Rembrandt, Artemisia, c. 1634

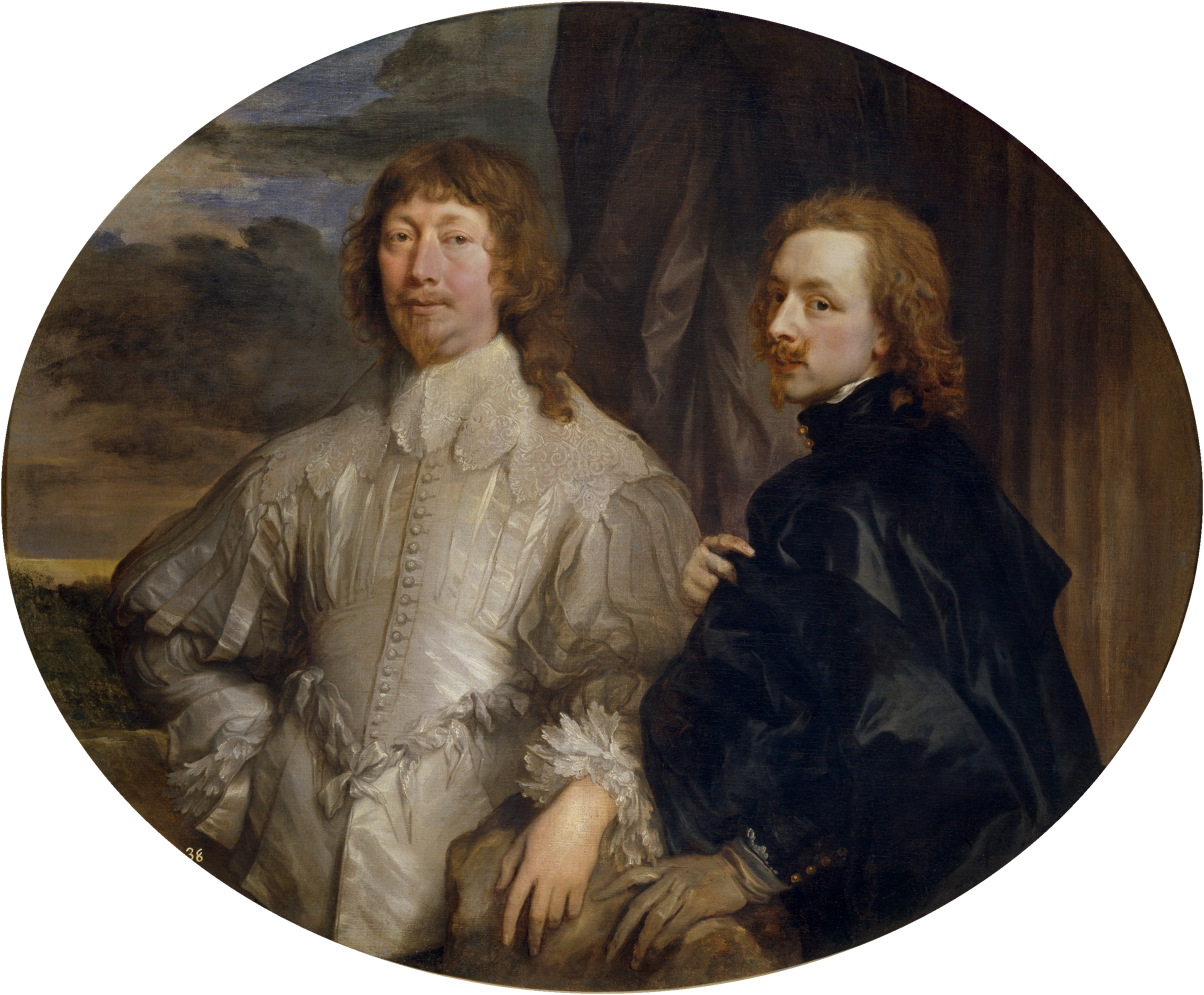
Anthony van Dyck, Self-portrait with Endymion Porter, c. 1635

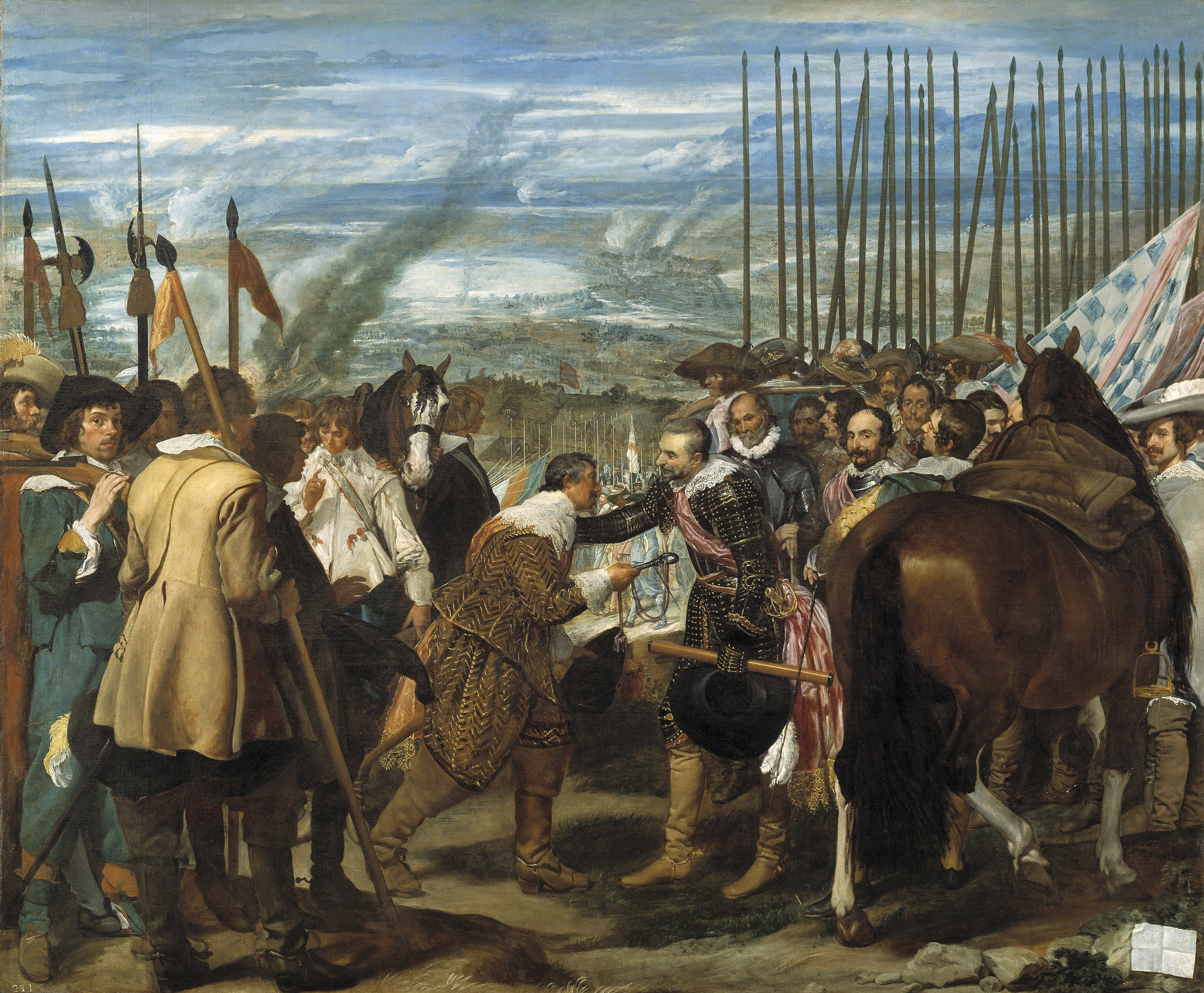
Diego Velázquez, The Surrender of Breda, 1634–35

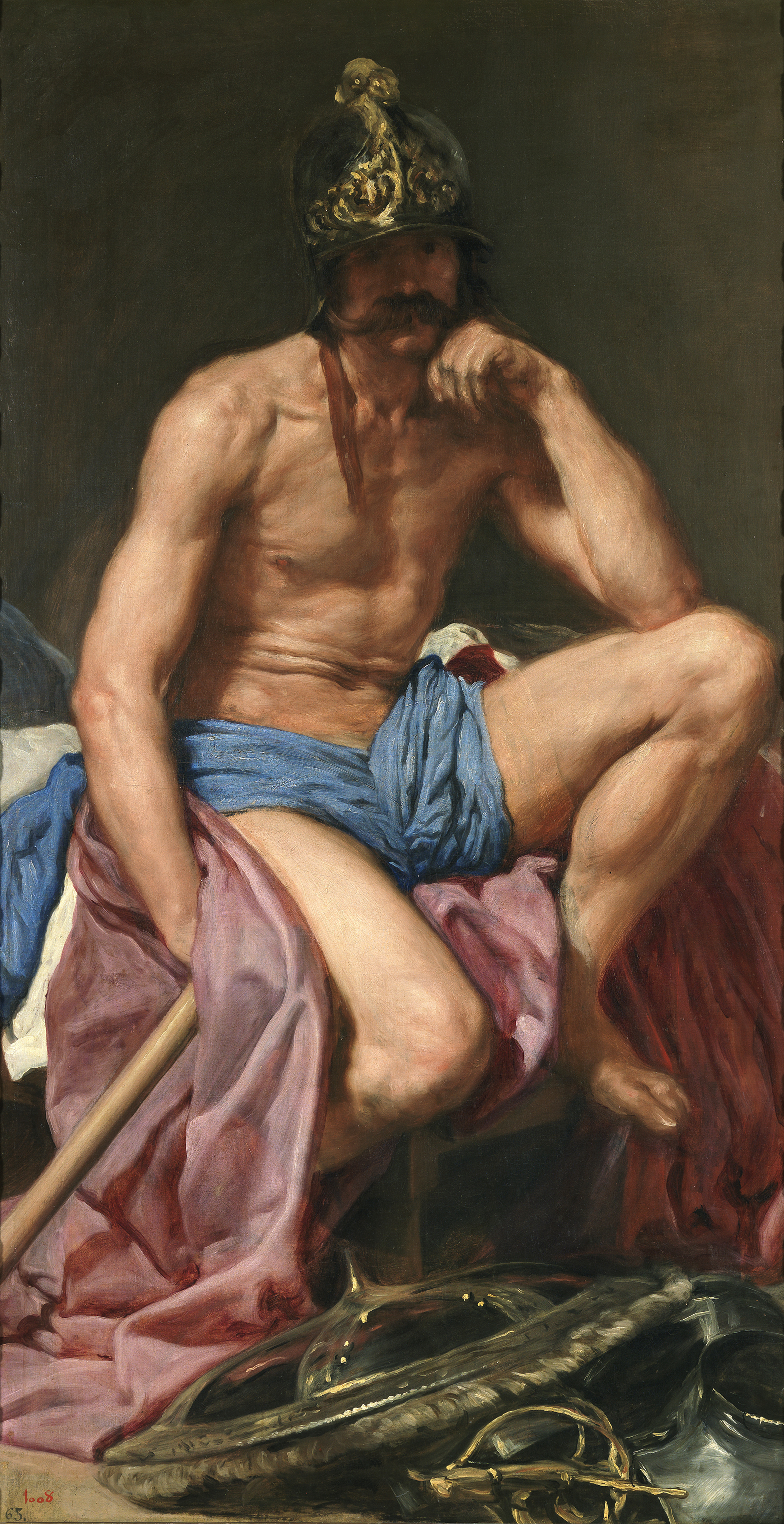
Diego Velázquez, Mars Resting, 1639–1641

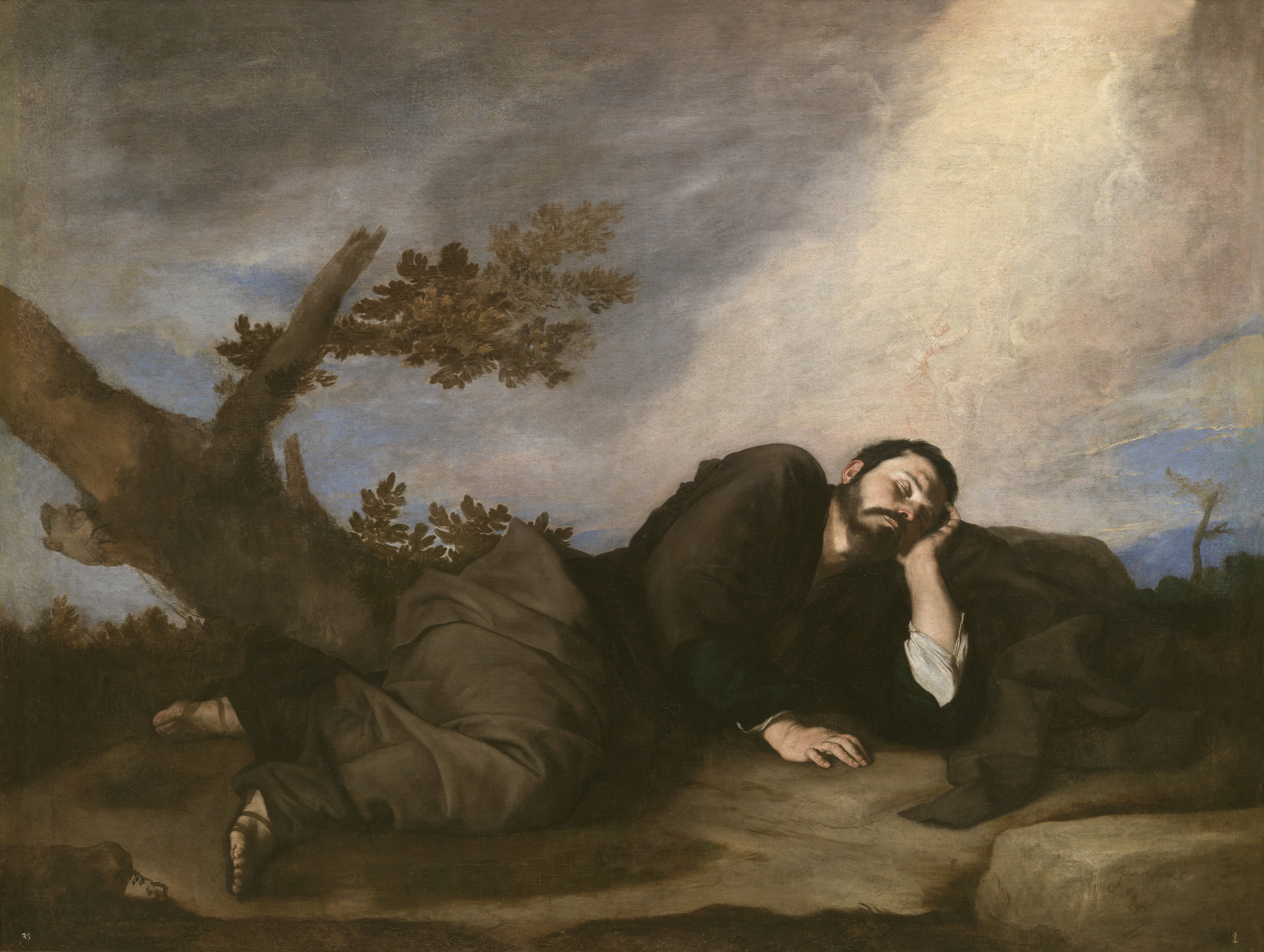
José de Ribera, Jacob's Dream, 1639

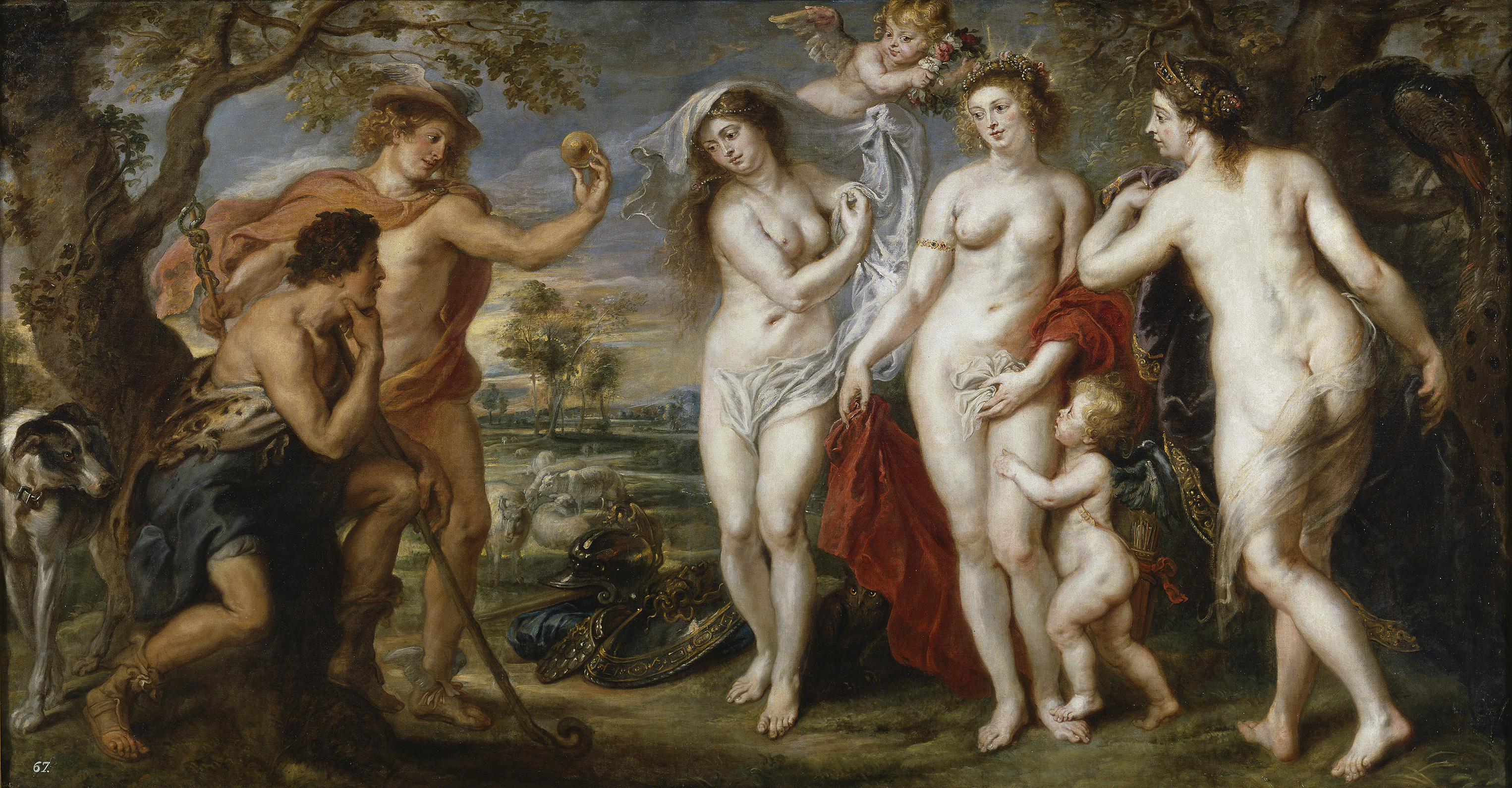
Peter Paul Rubens, The Judgement of Paris, 1638–39

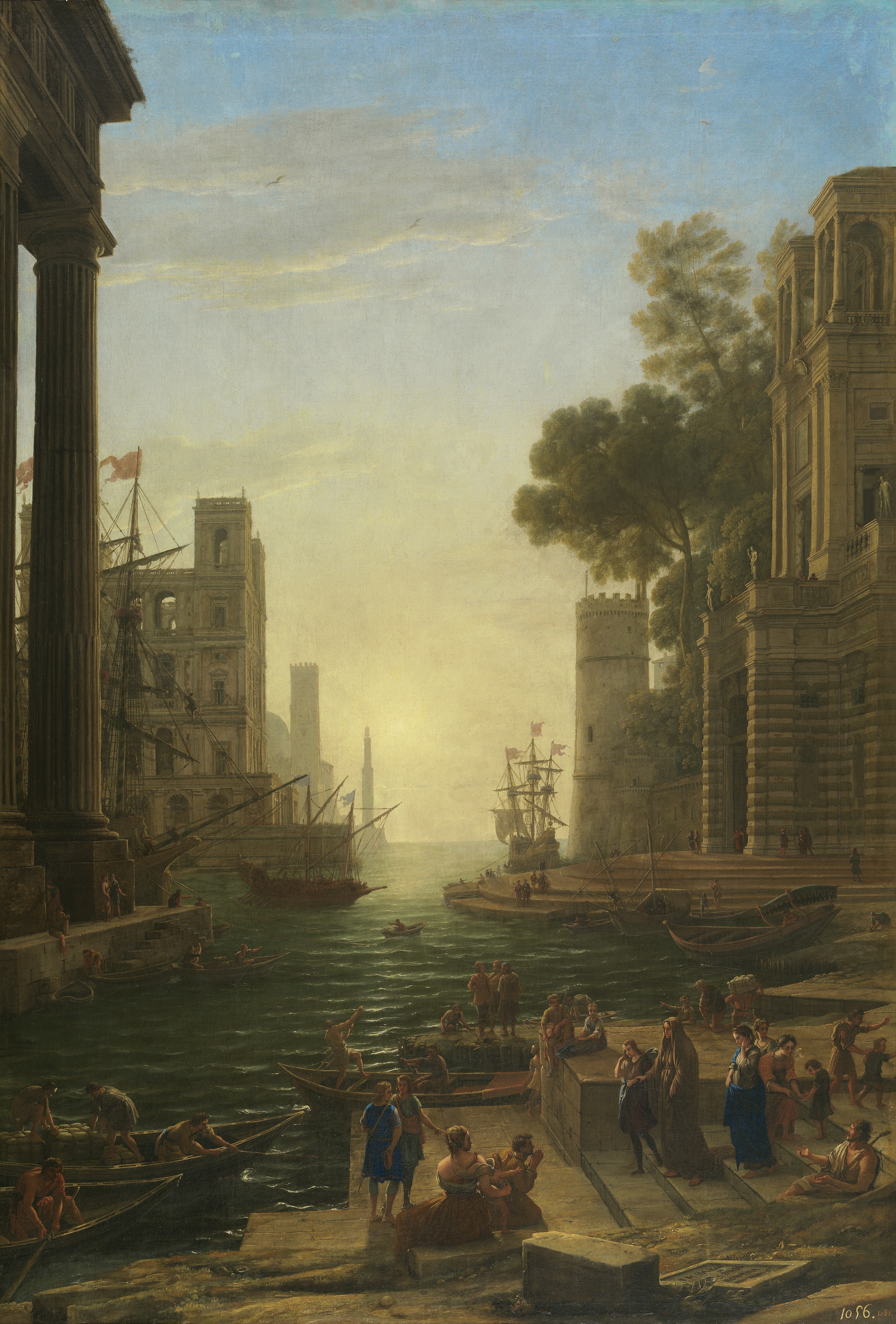
Claude Lorrain El embarque de santa Paula, 1639–40

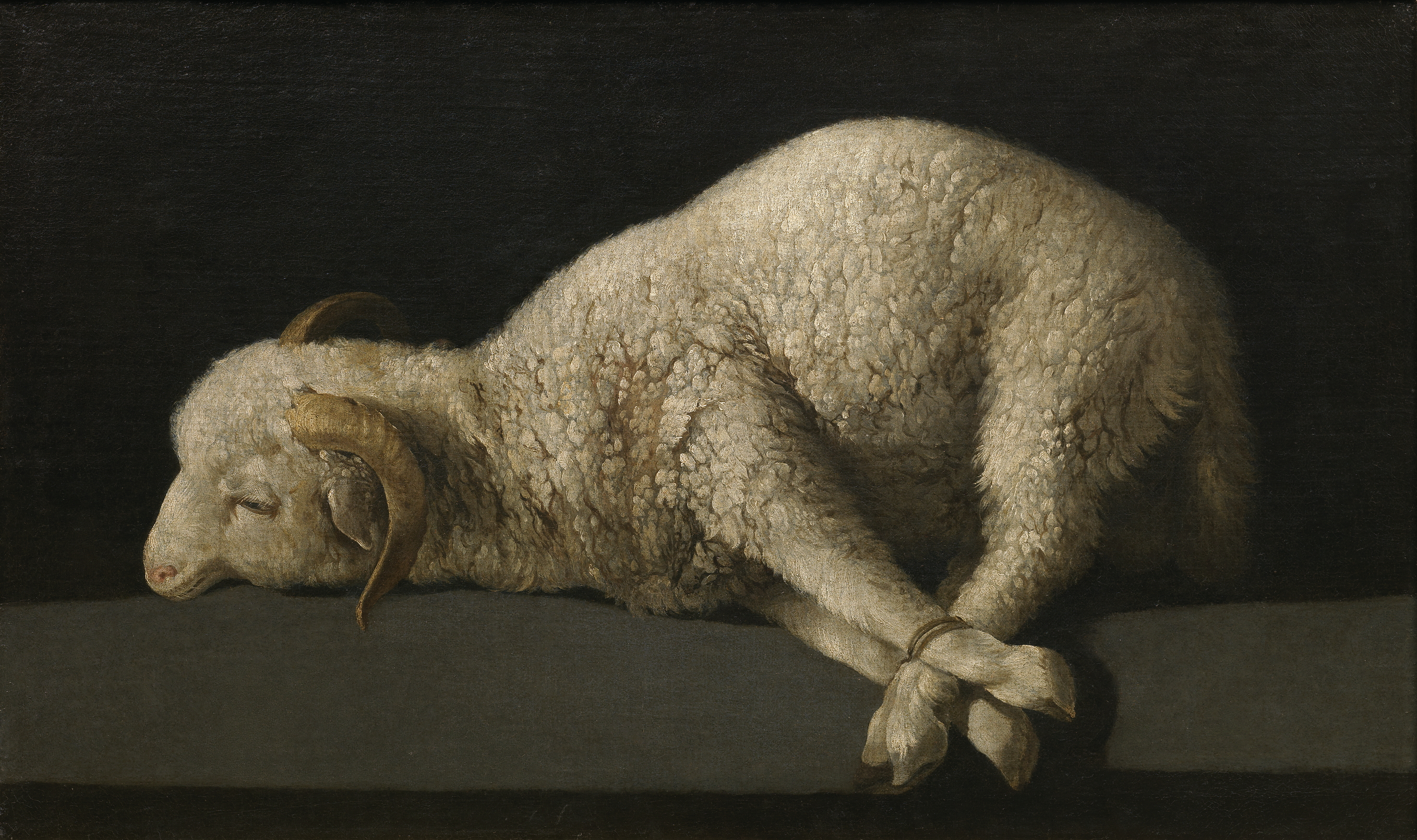
Francisco de Zurbarán, Agnus Dei, 1635–1640

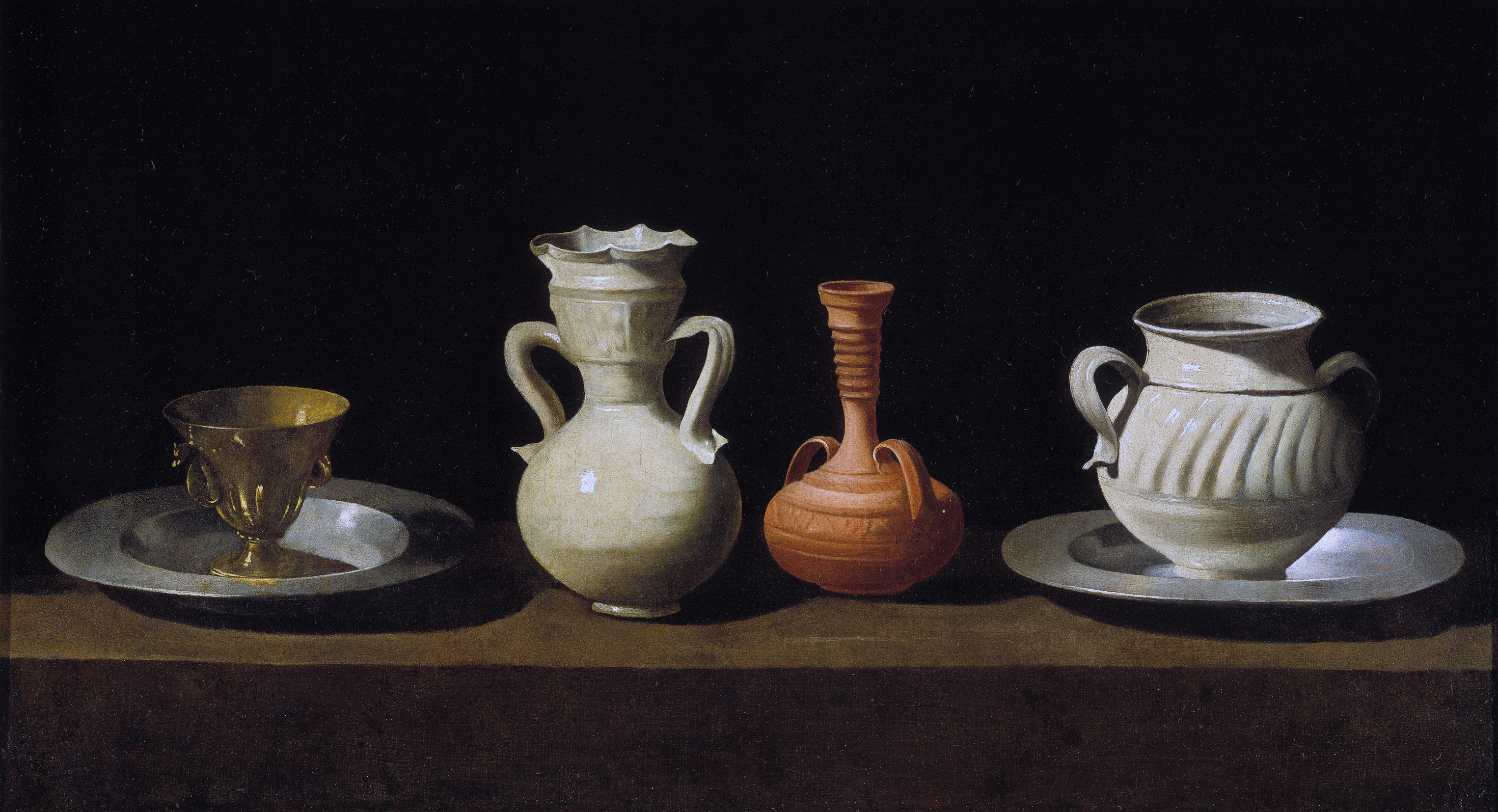
Francisco de Zurbarán, Still Life with Pots, c. 1650

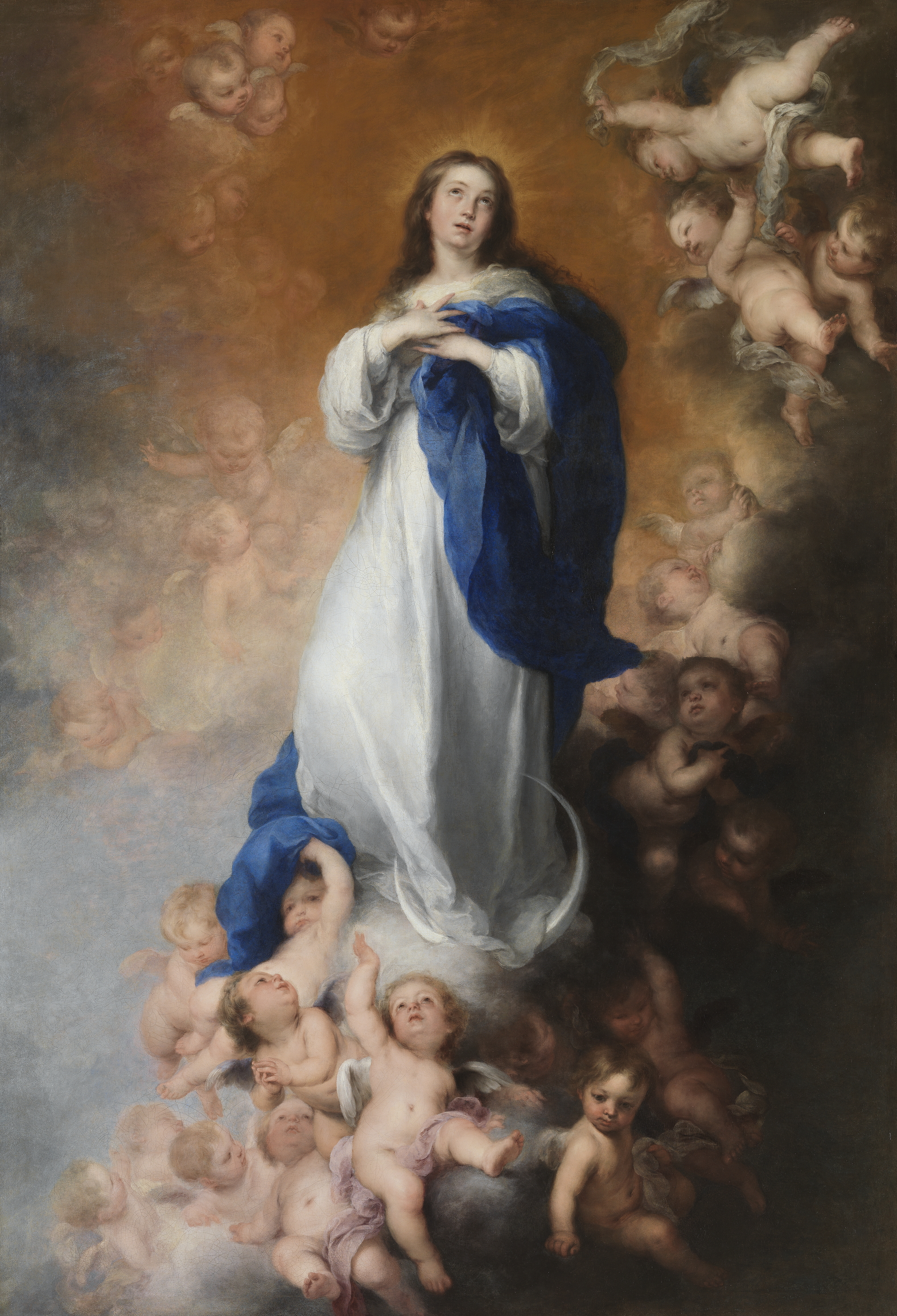
Bartolomé Esteban Murillo, La Inmaculada de Soult, 1678

Giovanni Battista Tiepolo, The Immaculate Conception, 1767

Francisco Goya, The Third of May 1808, 1814

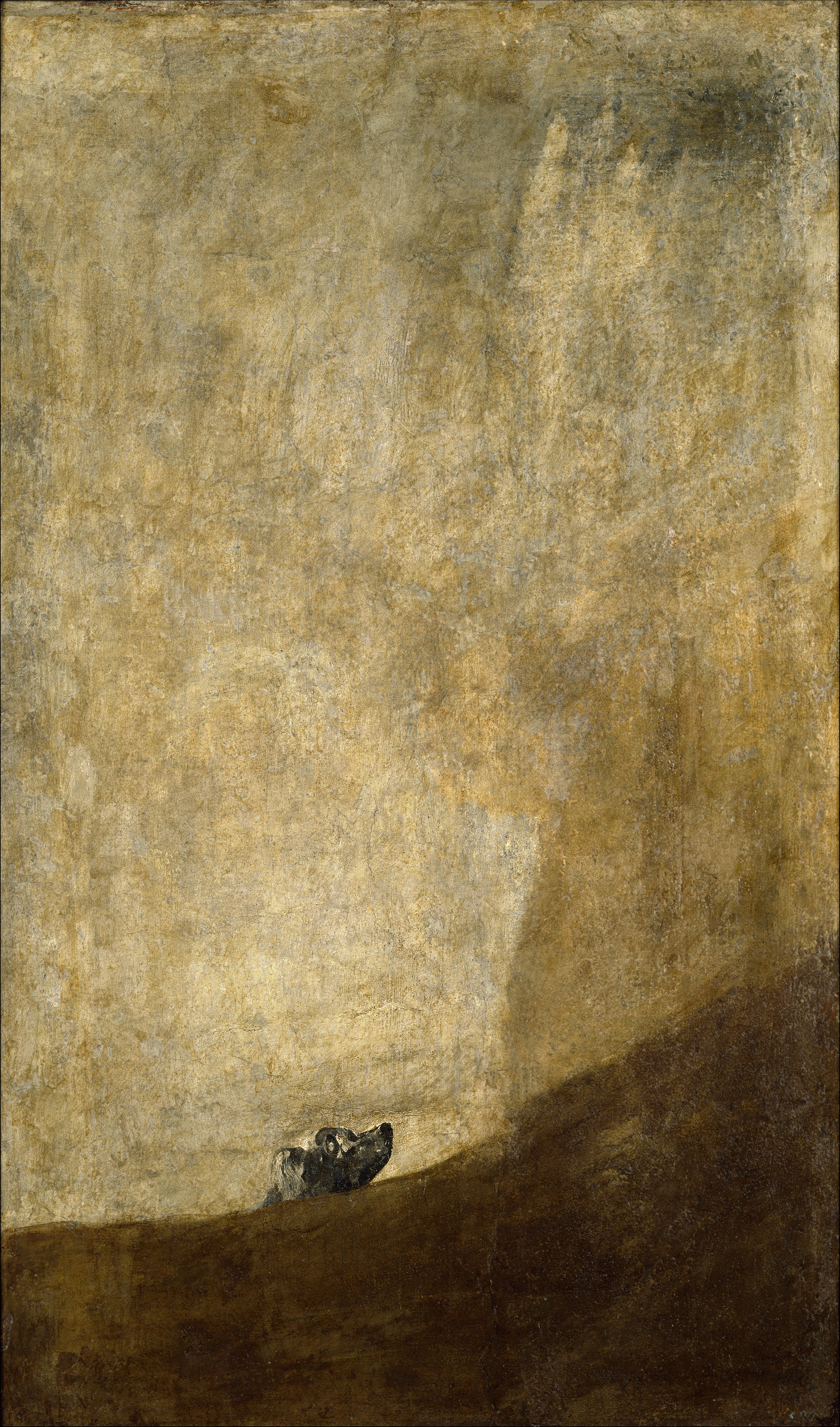
Francisco Goya, The Dog, 1819–1823

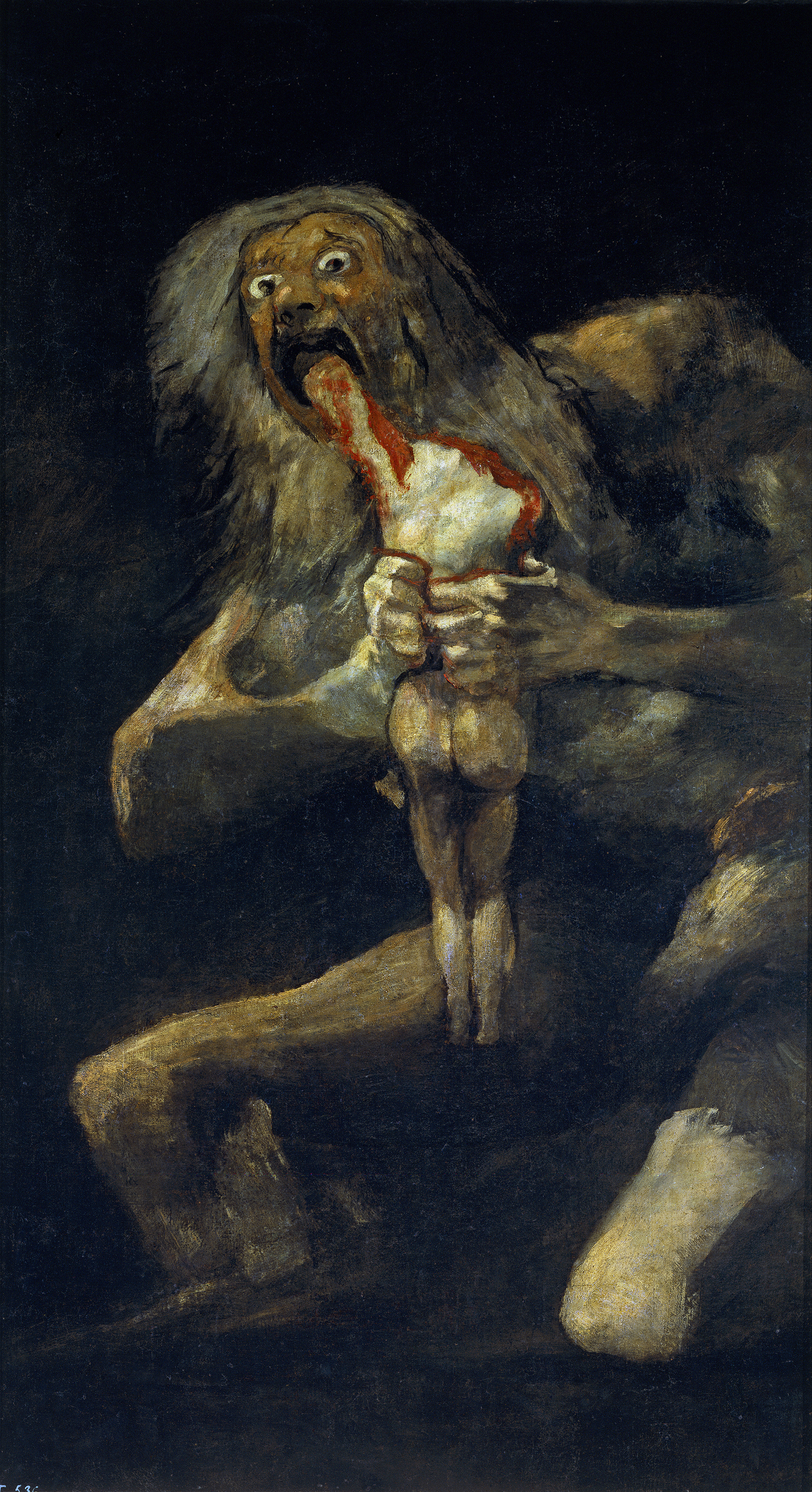
Francisco Goya, Saturn Devouring His Son, 1819–1823

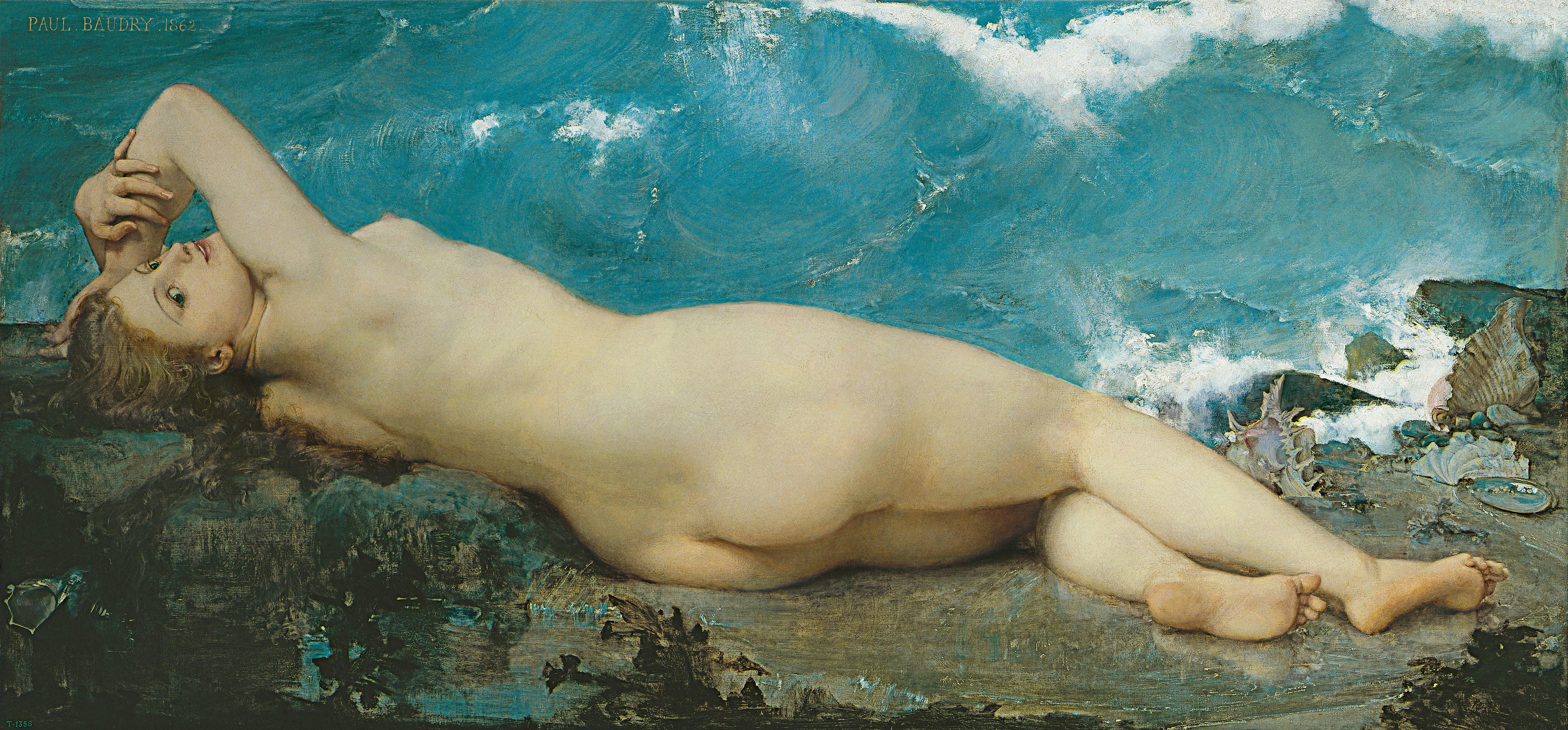
Paul Baudry, The Pearl and the Wave, 1862

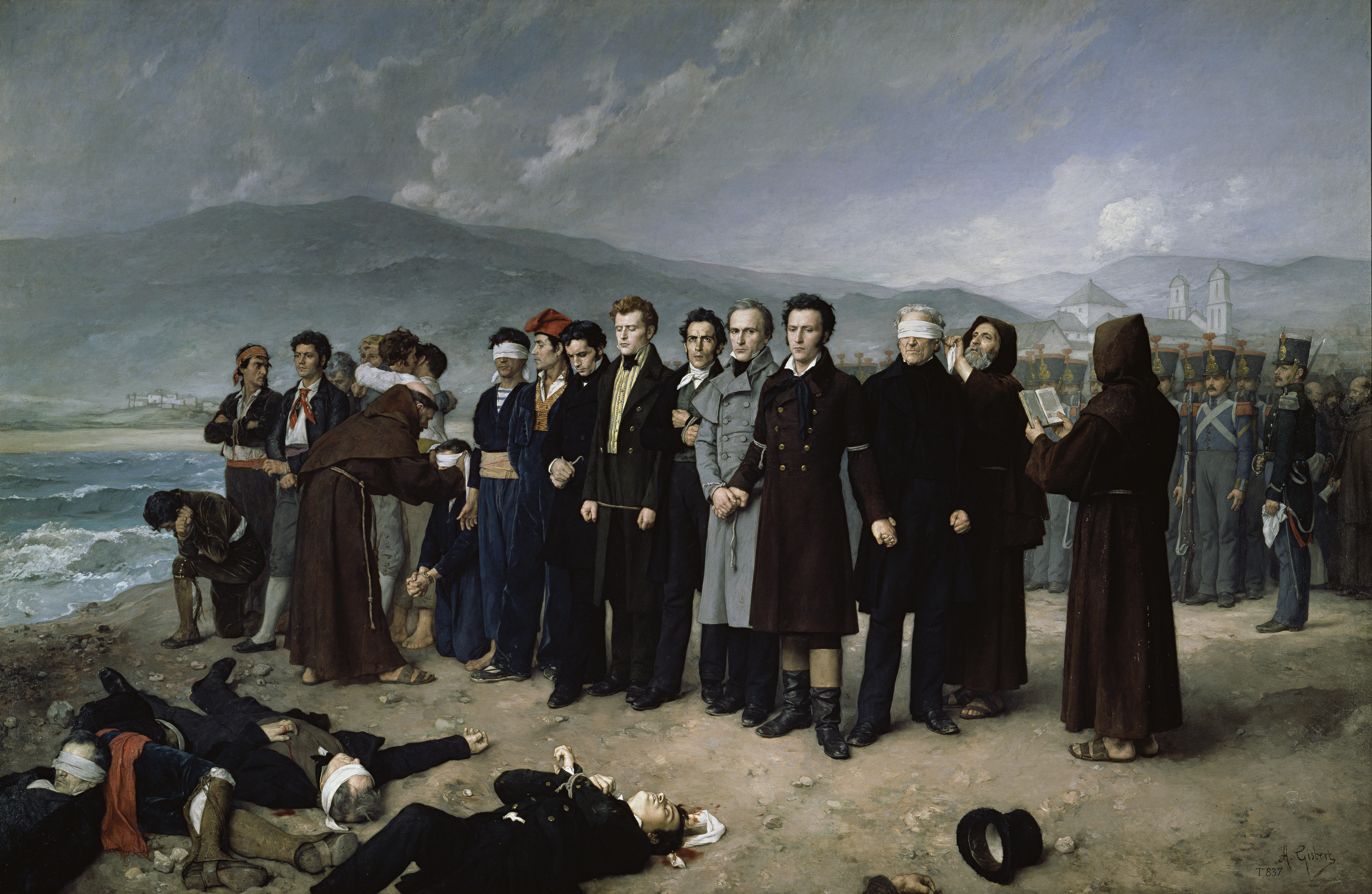
Antonio Gisbert Pérez, Execution of Torrijos and his Companions on the Beach at Málaga, 1882

== Management ==
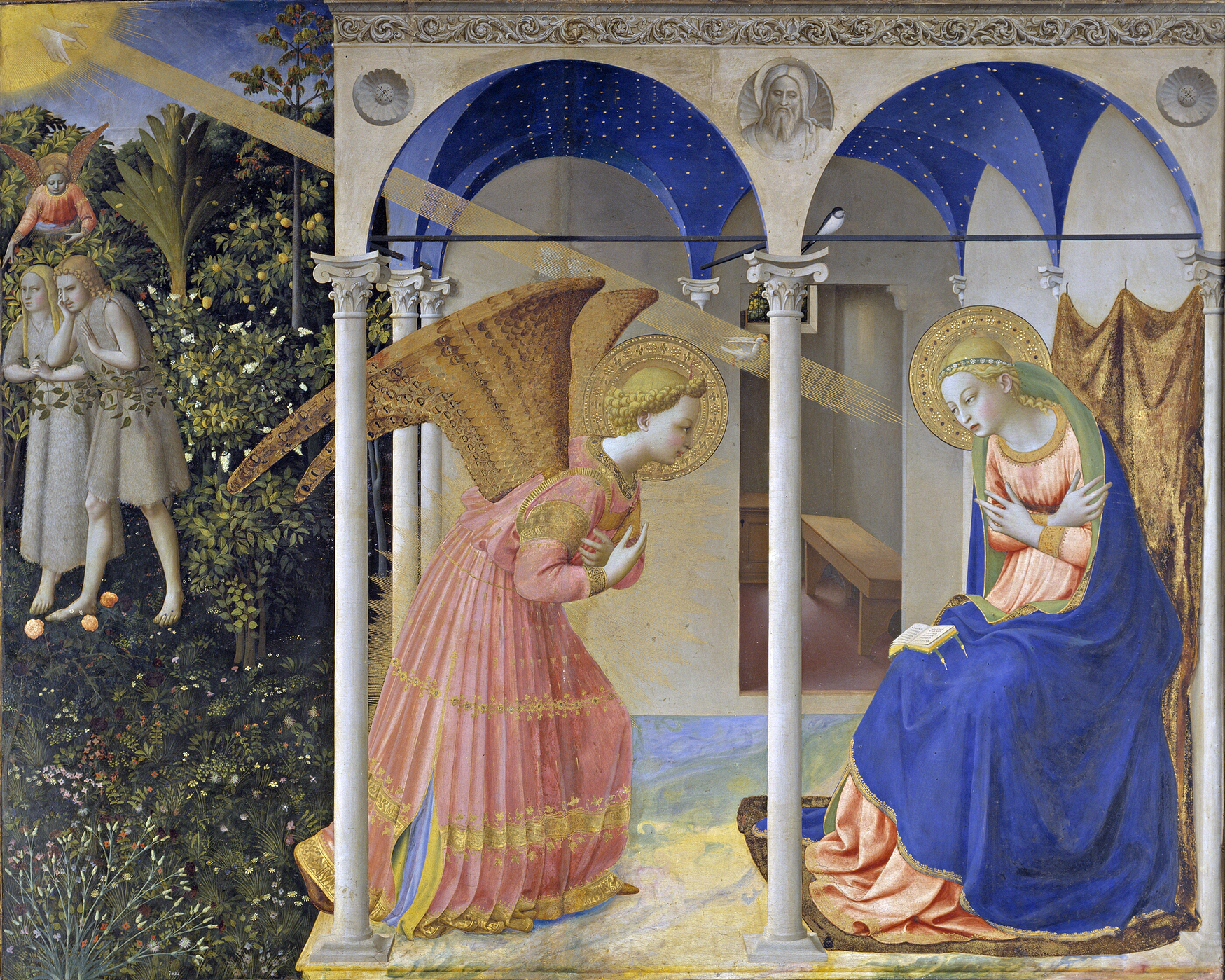
Fra Angelico, Annunciation, 1430–1432

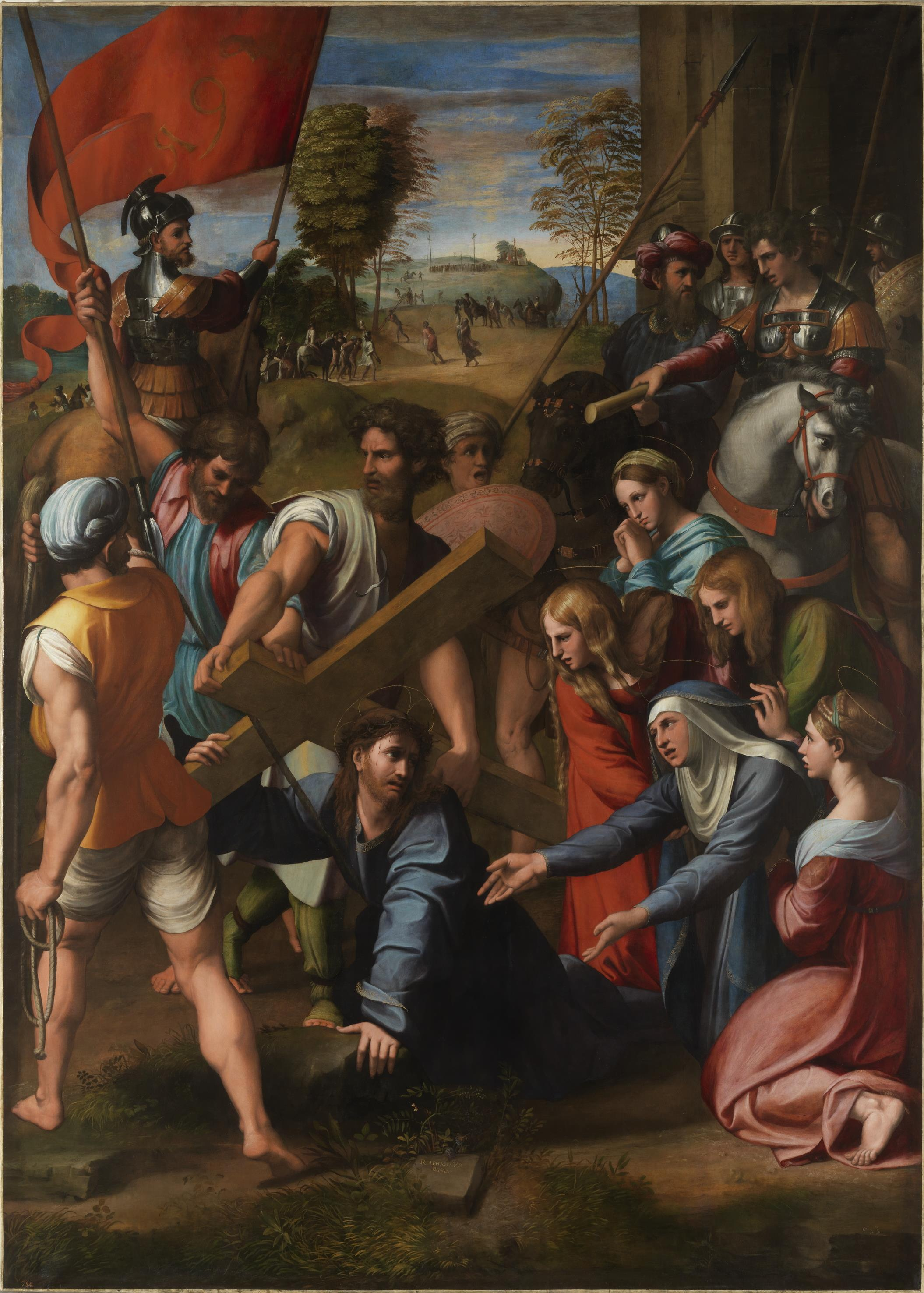
Raphael, Christ Falling on the Way to Calvary, 1517

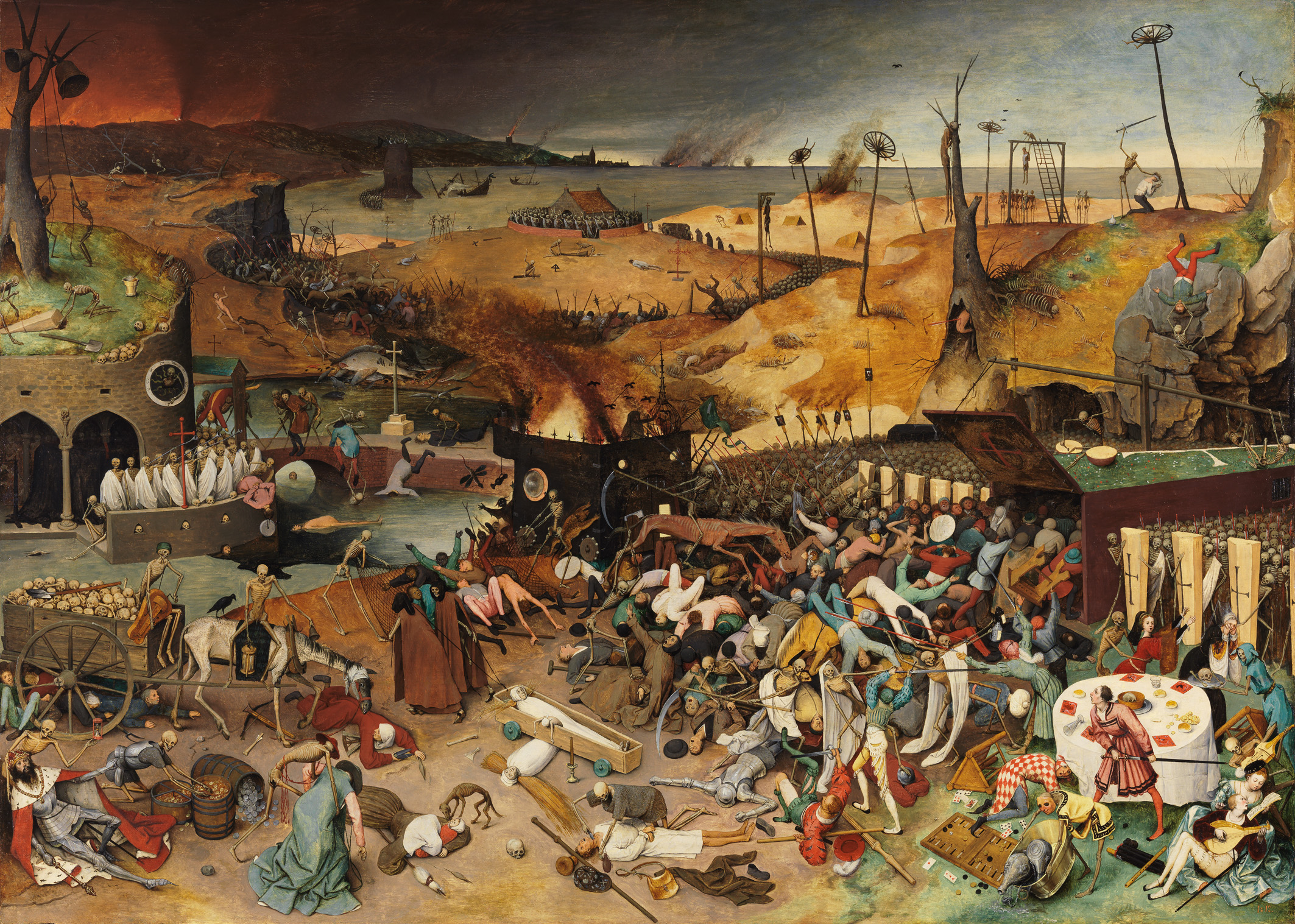
Pieter Bruegel the Elder, The Triumph of Death, c. 1562

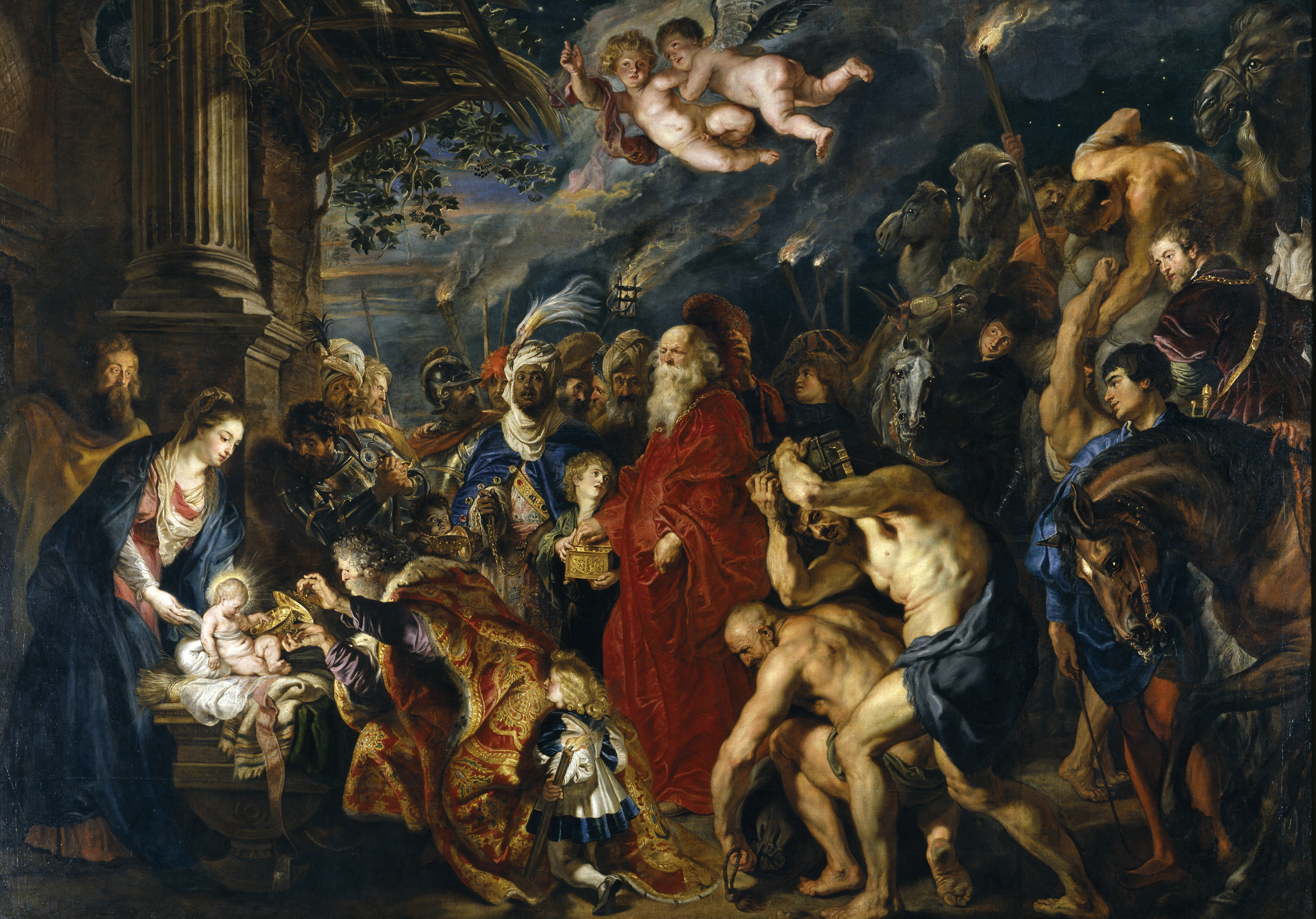
Peter Paul Rubens, The Adoration of the Magi, 1609/1628–1629

Peter Paul Rubens, The Three Graces, c. 1635

=== Funding ===
In 1991, Manuel Villaescusa bequeathed his fortune of nearly $40 million in Madrid real estate to the Prado, to be used solely for the acquisition of paintings. The museum subsequently sold Villaescusa's buildings to realize income from them. The bequest suddenly made the Prado one of the most formidable bidders for paintings in the world.

Until the early 2000s, the Prado's annual income was approximately $18 million, $15 million of which came from the government and the remainder from private contributions, publications, and admissions. In 2001, the conservative government of José María Aznar decided to change the museum's financing platform, ushering in a public-private partnership. Under its new bylaws, which the Cortes Generales approved in 2003, the Prado must gradually reduce its level of state support to 50 percent from 80 percent. In exchange, the museum gained control of the budget—which was roughly €35 million in 2004—and the power to raise money from corporate donations and merchandising. However, its 2004 €150 million expansion was paid for by the Spanish state.

=== Directors ===
The first four directors were drawn from nobility. From 1838 to 1960, the directors were mostly artists. Since then, most of them have been art historians.

- The Marquess of Santa Cruz, 1817–1820
- The Prince of Anglona, 1820–1823
- José Idiáquez Carvajal, 1823–1826
- The Duke of Híjar, 1826–1838
- José de Madrazo, 1838–1857
- Juan Antonio de Ribera, 1857–1860
- Federico de Madrazo, 1860–1868
- Antonio Gisbert, 1868–1873
- Francisco Sans Cabot, 1873–1881
- Federico de Madrazo, 1881–1894
- Vicente Palmaroli, 1894–1896
- Francisco Pradilla, 1896–1898
- Luis Álvarez Catalá, 1898–1901
- José Villegas Cordero, 1901–1918
- Aureliano de Beruete y Moret, 1918–1922
- Fernando Álvarez de Sotomayor, 1922–1931
- Ramón Pérez de Ayala, 1931–1936
- Pablo Ruiz Picasso, 1936–1939
- Fernando Álvarez de Sotomayor, 1939–1960
- Francisco Javier Sánchez Cantón, 1960–1968
- Diego Angulo Íñiguez, 1968–1971
- Xavier de Salas Bosch, 1971–1978
- José Manuel Pita Andrade, 1978–1981
- Federico Sopeña, 1981–1983
- Alfonso Pérez Sánchez, 1983–1991
- Felipe Garín Llombart, 1991–1993
- Francisco Calvo Serraller, 1993–1994
- José María Luzón Nogué, 1994–1996
- Fernando Checa Cremades, 1996–2002
- Miguel Zugaza Miranda, 2002–2017
- Miguel Falomir, 2017–present

== In Google Earth ==
In 2009, the Prado Museum selected 14 of its most important paintings to be displayed in Google Earth and Google Maps at extremely high resolution, with the largest displayed at 14,000 megapixels. The images' zoom capability allows for close-up views of paint texture and fine detail.

== Nearby museums ==
A few meters away there are two museums of international significance, the Thyssen-Bornemisza Museum and the Museo Reina Sofía.

Nearby is the Real Academia de Bellas Artes de San Fernando. The Museo Arqueológico houses the archaeological collections formerly in the collection of the Prado, with works from Spain, Ancient Egypt, Mesopotamia, Greece, and Rome.

The Naval museum, managed by the Ministry of Defence, is also nearby.

== Special exhibitions ==
Between 8 November 2011 and 25 March 2012, a group of 179 works of art were brought to the Museo del Prado from the Hermitage Museum in St. Petersburg. Notable works included:

- A Scholar (1631), by Rembrandt
- The Lute Player (c. 1596), by Caravaggio
- Ecstasy of Saint Teresa (1647), by Bernini
- Game of Bowls (1908), by Henri Matisse
- Bouquet of Cornflowers with Stems of Oats in a Vase (c. 1900), by House of Fabergé
- Pond at Montgeron (1876), by Claude Monet
- Belt buckle with a monster attacking a horse, (4th–3rd century BC), (gold ornament from Peter I's Siberian Collection)
- Moonrise, Two Men on the Shore (c. 1900), by Caspar David Friedrich
- Composition VI (1913), by Wassily Kandinsky
- Metaphysical Still life (1918), by Giorgio Morandi

Conversely, for the first time in its 200-year history, the Museo del Prado has toured an exhibition of its renowned collection of Italian masterpieces at the National Gallery of Victoria in Melbourne, Australia, from 16 May 2014 until 31 August 2014. Many of the works have never before left Spain.

== See also ==
- List of largest art museums
- Josefa Bayeu (painting)
