= Andreoli =

Andreoli is an Italian surname. Notable people with the surname include:

- Arnaldo Andreoli (1893–1952), Italian gymnast
- Attilio Andreoli (1877–1950), Italian painter
- Carlo Andreoli (1840–1908), Italian pianist
- David Andreoli (born 1982), Swiss-Italian footballer
- Elvia Andreoli (c.1950–2020), Argentine actress
- Evangelista Andreoli (1810–1875), Italian organist and music teacher
- Ezequiel Andreoli (born 1978), Argentine footballer
- Felipe Andreoli (born 1980), Brazilian musician
- Felipe Andreoli (journalist) (born 1980), Brazilian journalist and humorist
- Franco Andreoli (1915–2009), Swiss footballer
- Giorgio Andreoli (died 1553), Italian potter
- Giuseppe Andreoli (painter) (1720–1776), Italian painter
- Giuseppe Andreoli (bassist) (1757–1832), Italian double-bassist
- Guglielmo Andreoli the Elder (1835–1860), Italian pianist
- Guglielmo Andreoli the Younger (1862–1932), Italian pianist, teacher, and composer, brother of the preceding
- John Andreoli (born 1990), American baseball player
- Sergio Andreoli (1922–2002), Italian footballer
- Severino Andreoli (born 1941), Italian cyclist
- Tatiana Andreoli (born 1999), Italian archer
