= Guglielmo Andreoli =

Guglielmo Andreoli is the name of two brothers:

- Guglielmo Andreoli the Elder (1835–1860), Italian pianist
- Guglielmo Andreoli the Younger (1862–1932), Italian pianist, teacher, and composer
