= Pietro Paltronieri =

Italian painter

- Born: 27 July 1673; Mirandola, Duchy of Mirandola, in present-day Italy
- Died: 8 July 1741, (aged 67); Bologna
- Known for: Painting

Pietro Paltronieri, also referred to as il Mirandolese (1673–1741) was an Italian painter of the late Baroque period, known for his capricci and active mainly in Rome, Bologna, and Vienna.

== Biography ==
He was a pupil of Giovanni Francesco Cassana and Marcantonio Chiarini. In quadratura, he collaborated with Ercole Graziani the Younger. He was known as Il Mirandolese dalle Prospettive to distinguish him from his contemporary fellow countryman, Giuseppe Perracini. Both had studied together with Giovanni Francesco Cassana in Modena, prior to moving to Bologna.

== Gallery ==
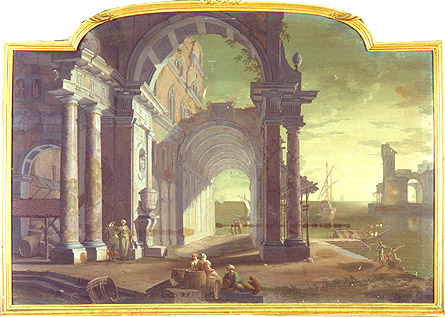
Landscape with Ruins

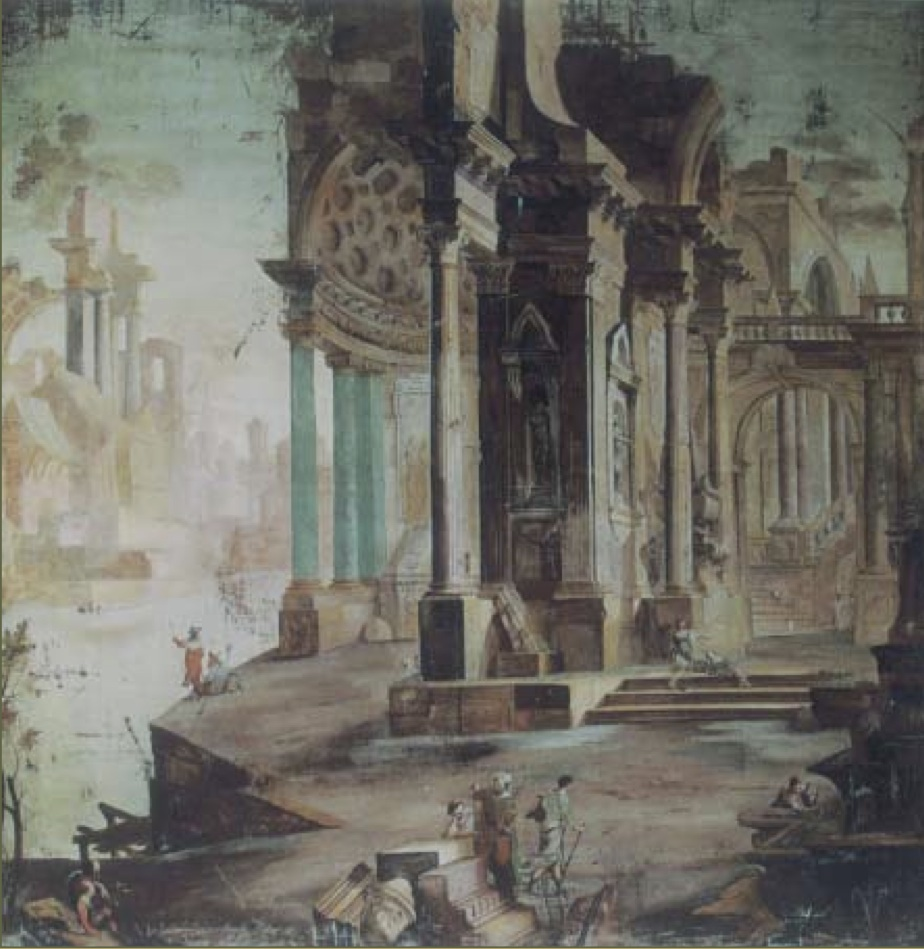
A View with Ruins

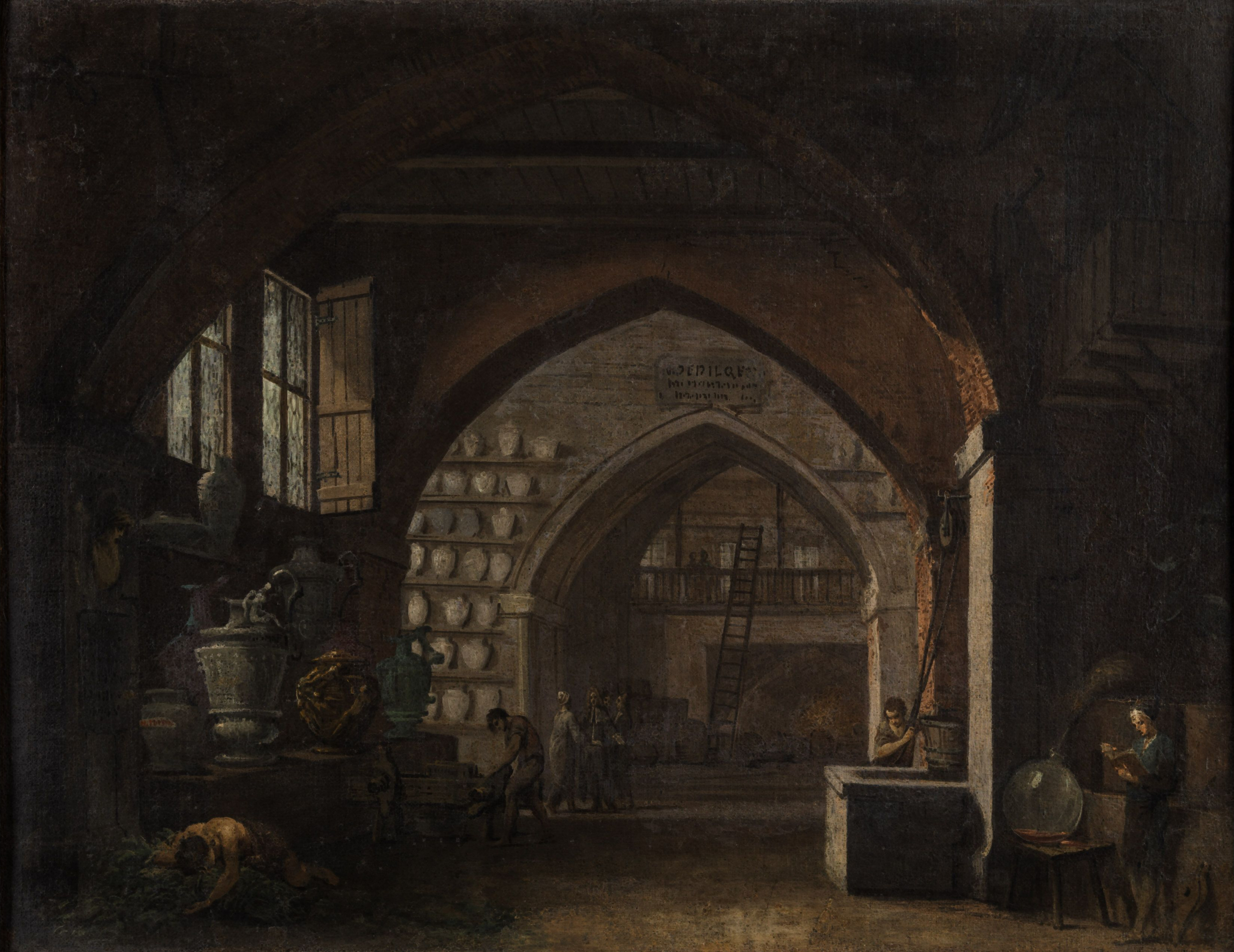
Interiors

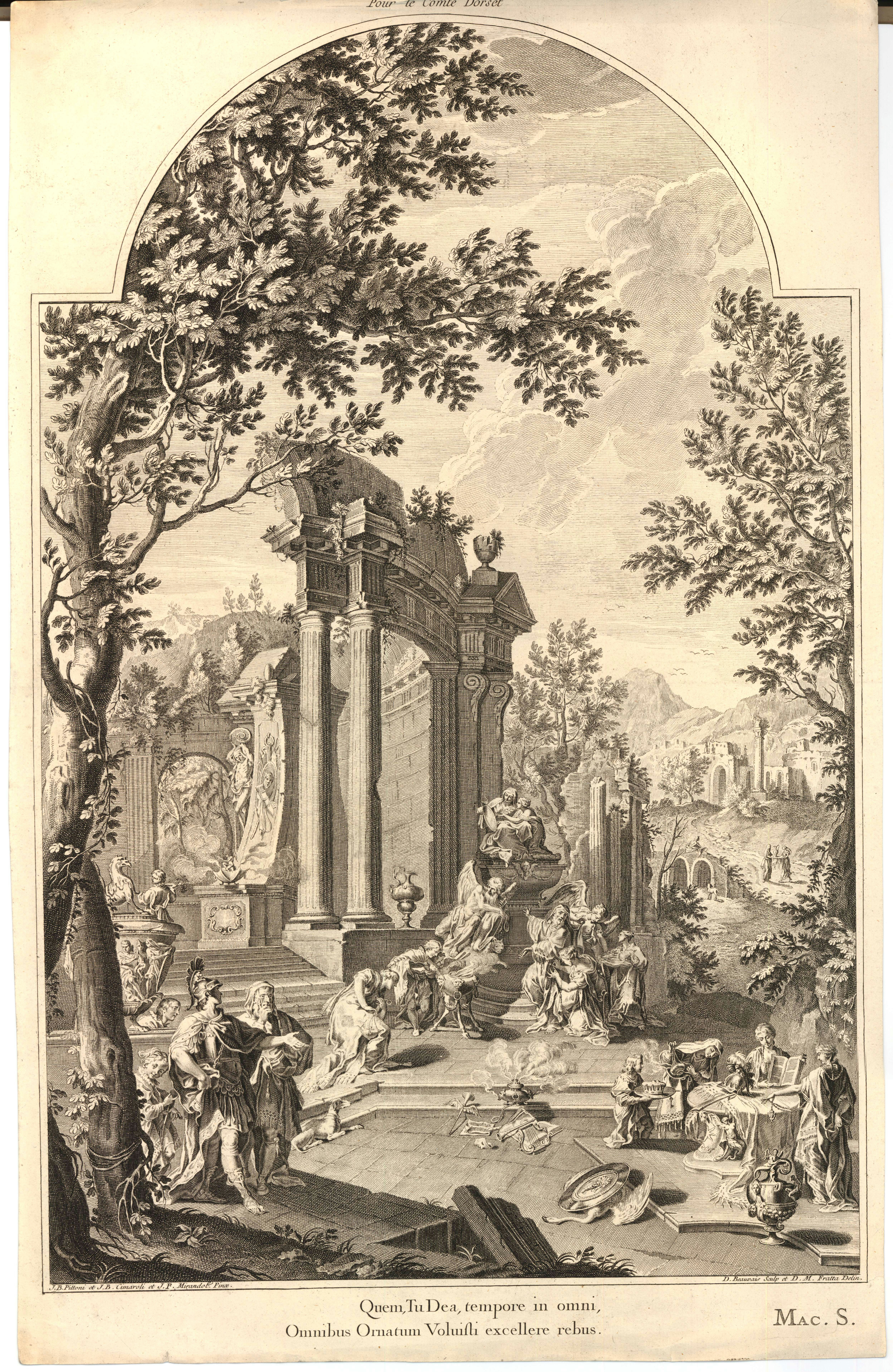
Allegoric grave of Lord Dorset

== Bibliography ==
- Farquhar, Maria (1855). Ralph Nicholson Wornum (ed.). Biographical catalogue of the principal Italian painters. London: Woodfall & Kinder. p. 118.
