= Giuseppe Andreoli =

Giuseppe Andreoli may refer to:

- Giuseppe Andreoli (bassist) (1757–1832), Italian contrabassist
- Giuseppe Andreoli (painter) (1720–1776), Italian painter
- Giuseppe Andreoli (general) (1892–1945), Italian general
