= Madonna of the Baldacchino =

Oil painting by Raphael, c.1506–1508

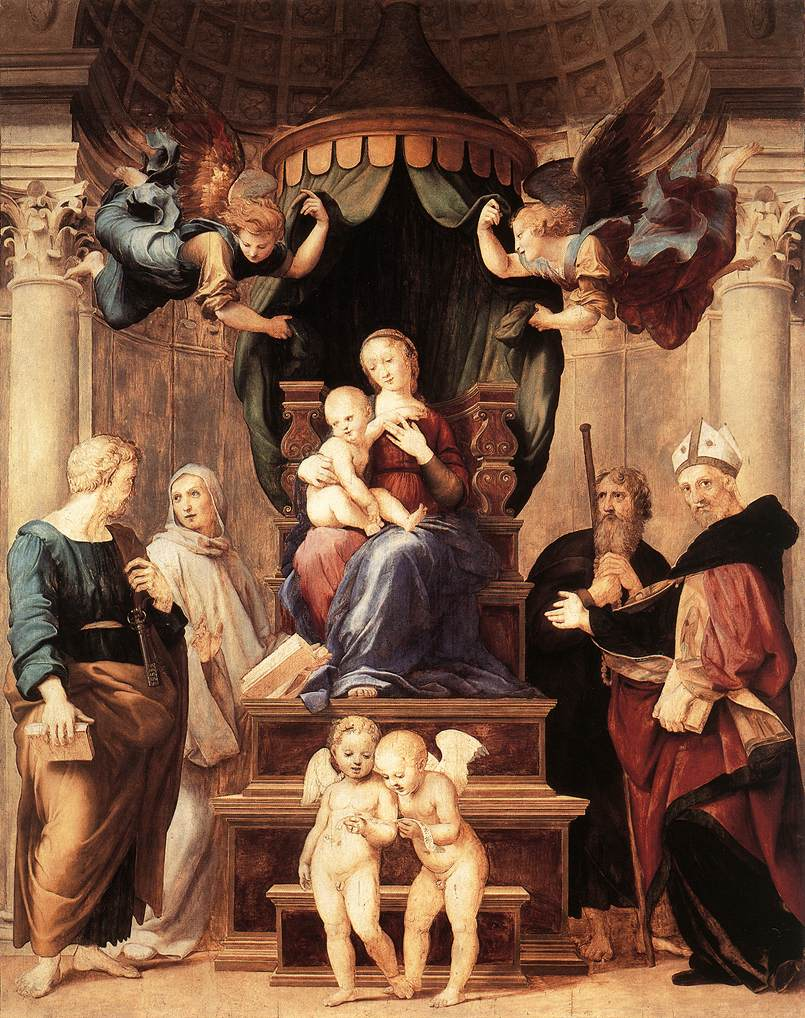
Madonna of the Baldacchino (c. 1506–1508) by Raphael

The Madonna of the Baldacchino is a c.1506-1508 oil on wood holy conversation-style painting by Raphael, now in the Galleria Palatina in Florence.

It was Raphael's first major commission in Florence, produced for the cappella Dei in Santo Spirito. It remained incomplete on the artist's return to Rome in 1508 after being summoned by pope Julius II. It was a popular model for artists such as Andrea del Sarto, Fra' Bartolomeo and Lorenzo Lotto in the 1510s, although another altarpiece was commissioned from Rosso Fiorentino for the chapel.

In Pescia Cathedral by the mid 16th century, Raphael's work was acquired by prince Ferdinando de' Medici in 1697. He had it restored and completed by the brothers Niccolò and Agostino Cassana. Ferdinando wished Raphael's work to act as a pendant to another work in his collection, Fra' Bartolomeo's Christ Among the Doctors, and so had a strip added to the top of Raphael's work to make it the same height as the other painting. Raphael's work was taken to Paris in 1799 and only returned to Florence in 1813.

== See also ==
- List of paintings by Raphael
