= Giovanni Agostino Cassana =

Italian painter

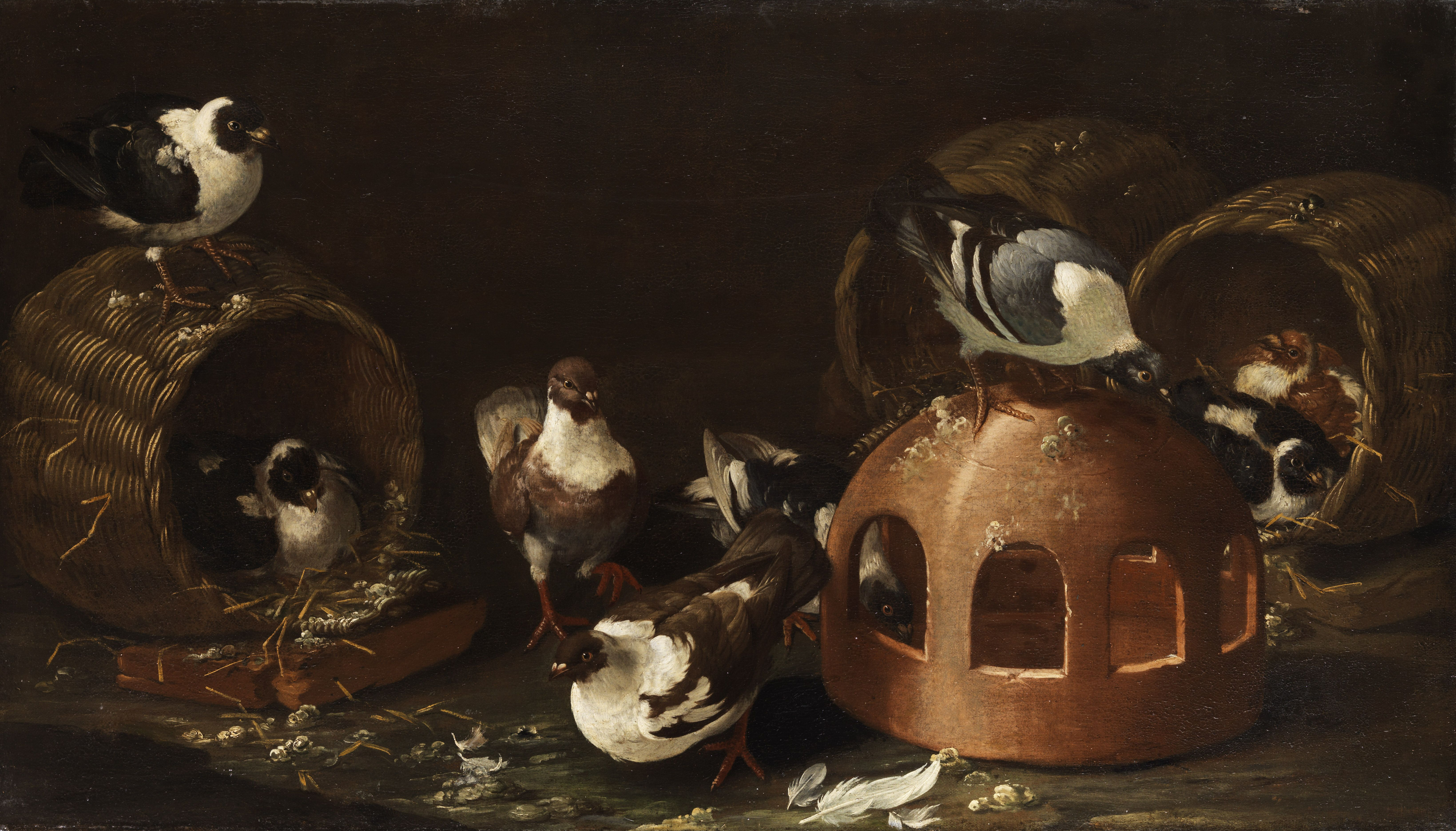
Pigeons feeding

Abate, or Giovanni Agostino Cassana (c.1658 – 6 May 1720) was an Italian painter of the Baroque period. He was a son of Giovanni Francesco Cassana and an elder brother of Niccolò and Giovanni Battista. He was born at Venice, and was initially instructed by his father. In 1670 he worked at the court of Ferdinando de' Medici in Florence and travelled regularly between the two cities, but spent at least the years 1718–1720 in Genoa, where he later died.

He painted portraits with some success, but preferred painting animals in the style of Antonio Maria Vasallo, Giovanni Benedetto Castiglione, and Joannes Fyt, a style which he learned from Jacques van de Kerckhove in Venice. Paintings of still life subjects are found in the collections at Florence, Venice, and Genoa.

== See also ==
- Cassana (family)
