= Giuseppe Andreoli (bassist) =

Milanese contrabassist (1757–1832)

Giuseppe Andreoli (7 July 1757 – 20 December 1832) was a Milanese contrabassist.

Born in Milan, Andreoli was a member of the orchestra of La Scala. He was also proficient on the harp. He became the first professor of bass at the Milan Conservatory in 1808.

He was the first teacher who promoted the three-finger system developed by Bonifazio Asioli in his treatise Elementi per il Contrabasso con una Nuova Maniera di Digitare (1823), which flourished in Italy by the mid-nineteenth century.

According to an 1840 letter from Paganini, Andreoli played an Amati bass, which had three strings, tuned in fourths.

The bassist was not related to the Andreoli family of pianists, who taught at the Milan Conservatory, including Carlo Andreoli and Guglielmo Andreoli.
