= Giuseppe Perracini =

Italian painter

Giuseppe Perracini or Peracini (Mirandola, 1672 – Bologna, 1754) was an Italian painter, active in a late Baroque style.

== Biography ==
He trained under Giovanni Francesco Cassana of Modena, Duchy of Modena and Reggio. He later moved to Bologna, Papal States, where he trained under Marcantonio Franceschini. Painting mainly history and sacred subjects, he was known as il Mirandolese. He painted an altarpiece for the church of San Martino Maggiore. He also painted many portraits. Among his pupils was Giuseppe Andreoli.
