= Giovan Battista Langetti =

Italian painter

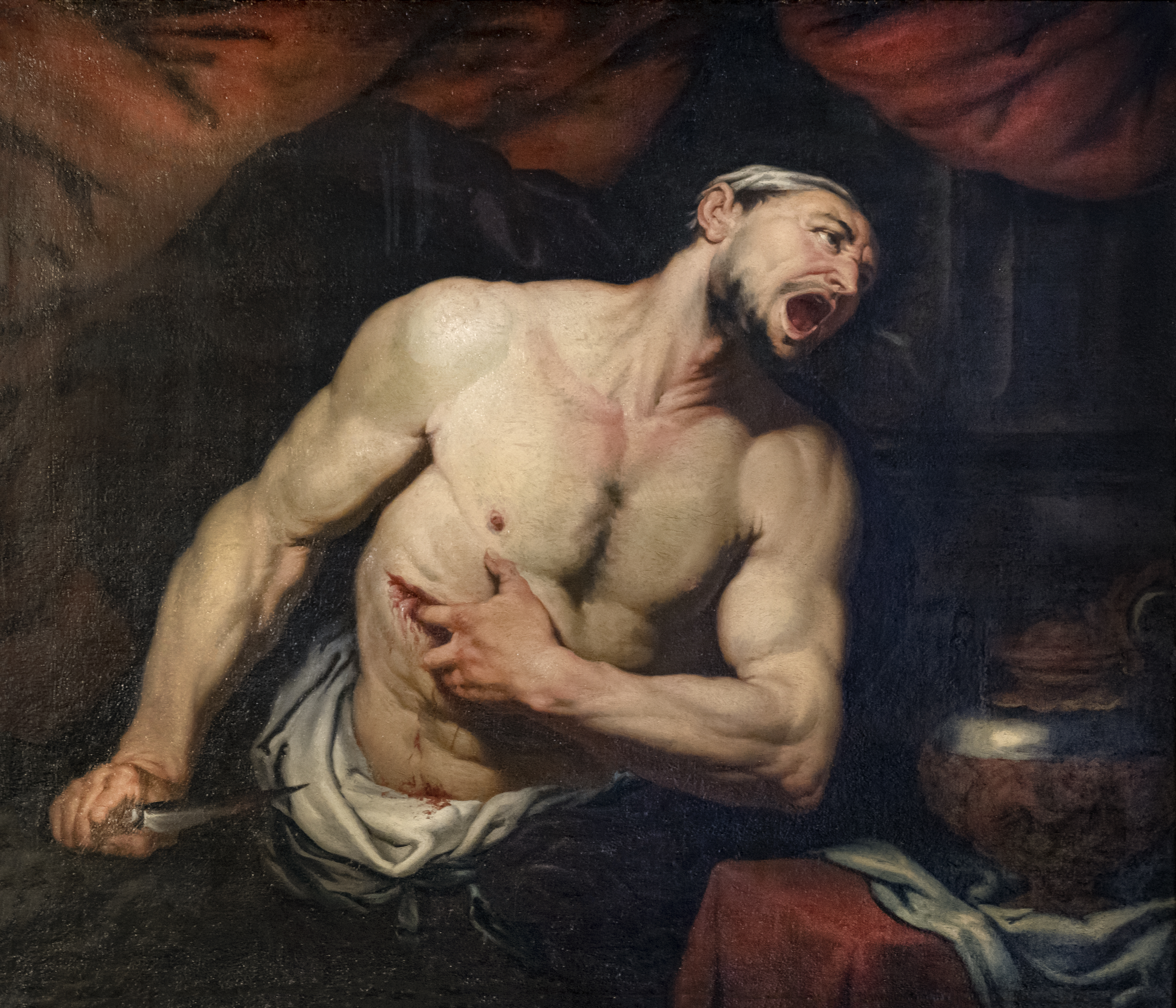
- Suicide of Cato, Ca' Rezzonico, Venice
- Born: 1635; Genoa, Republic of Genoa
- Died: 22 October 1676 (aged 40–41); Venice, Republic of Venice
- Education: Gioacchino Assereto; Pietro da Cortona
- Known for: Painting
- Movement: Baroque

Giovanni Battista Langetti (1635 – 22 October 1676), also known as Giambattista Langetti, was an Italian late-Baroque painter. He was active in his native Genoa, then Rome, and finally for the longest period in Venice.

== Biography ==
He first trained with Assereto, then Pietro da Cortona, but afterwards studied under Giovanni Francesco Cassana, appeared in Venice by the 1650s where he worked in a striking Caravaggesque style. He painted many historical busts for private patrons in the Venetian territory and in Lombardy. The Crucifixion with Mary Magdalene (1663–4; Venice, Santa Teresa) is Langetti's most important work. It is an impressive rendering, conveying powerful emotion, with a setting reminiscent of Anthony van Dyck. The St. Peter and St. Paul (1675; Padua, San Daniele) are distinguished by heavy monumental figures and broad brushstrokes.

In addition to this small core of dated works, Langetti's fame rests on his cabinet pieces, which show violent scenes from Classical mythology and from the lives of the ancient philosophers, for example Ixion in Chains (Museo de Arte de Ponce) and the Death of Cato (Genoa, Galleria di Palazzo Rosso); or from the Bible, such as the Death of Abel (Frankfurt am Main, Städel). With his realism, his theatrical use of light derived from Neapolitan painting, and his free, painterly surfaces, stimulated by the work of Jacopo Tintoretto and Bernardo Strozzi, Langetti had an enormous success in Venice.

Langetti died at Venice in 1676. A number of painters were influenced by his work, including Antonio Zanchi, Johann Carl Loth, Pietro Negri and Francesco Rosa, who have become known as tenebrists and who were prominent in the development of Venetian art in the second half of the Seicento.

== Gallery ==
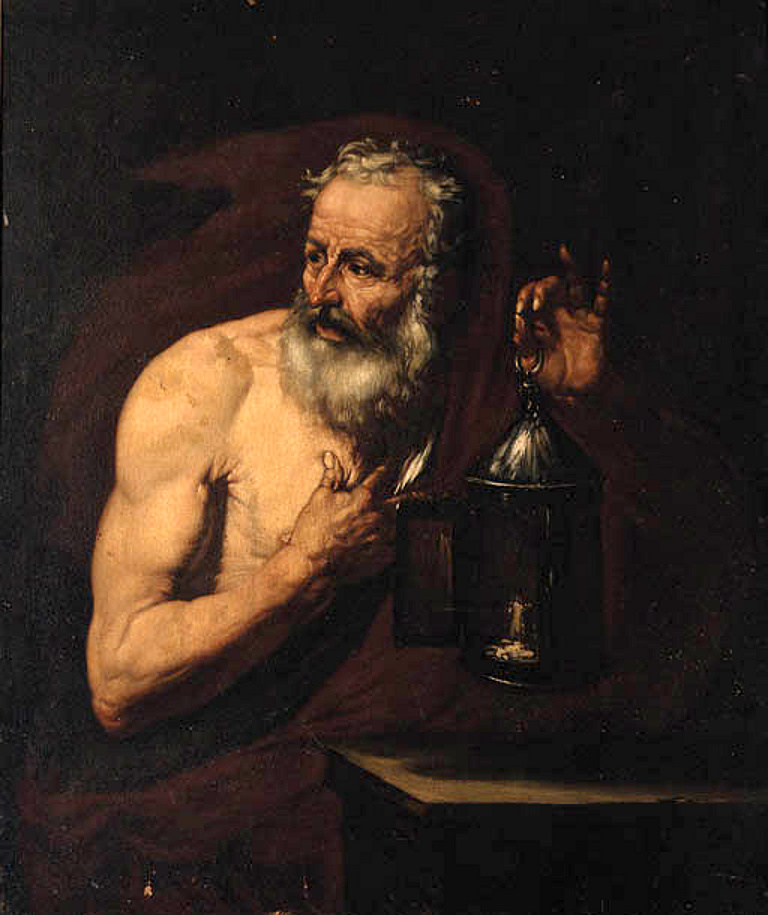
Diogenes, priv. col.

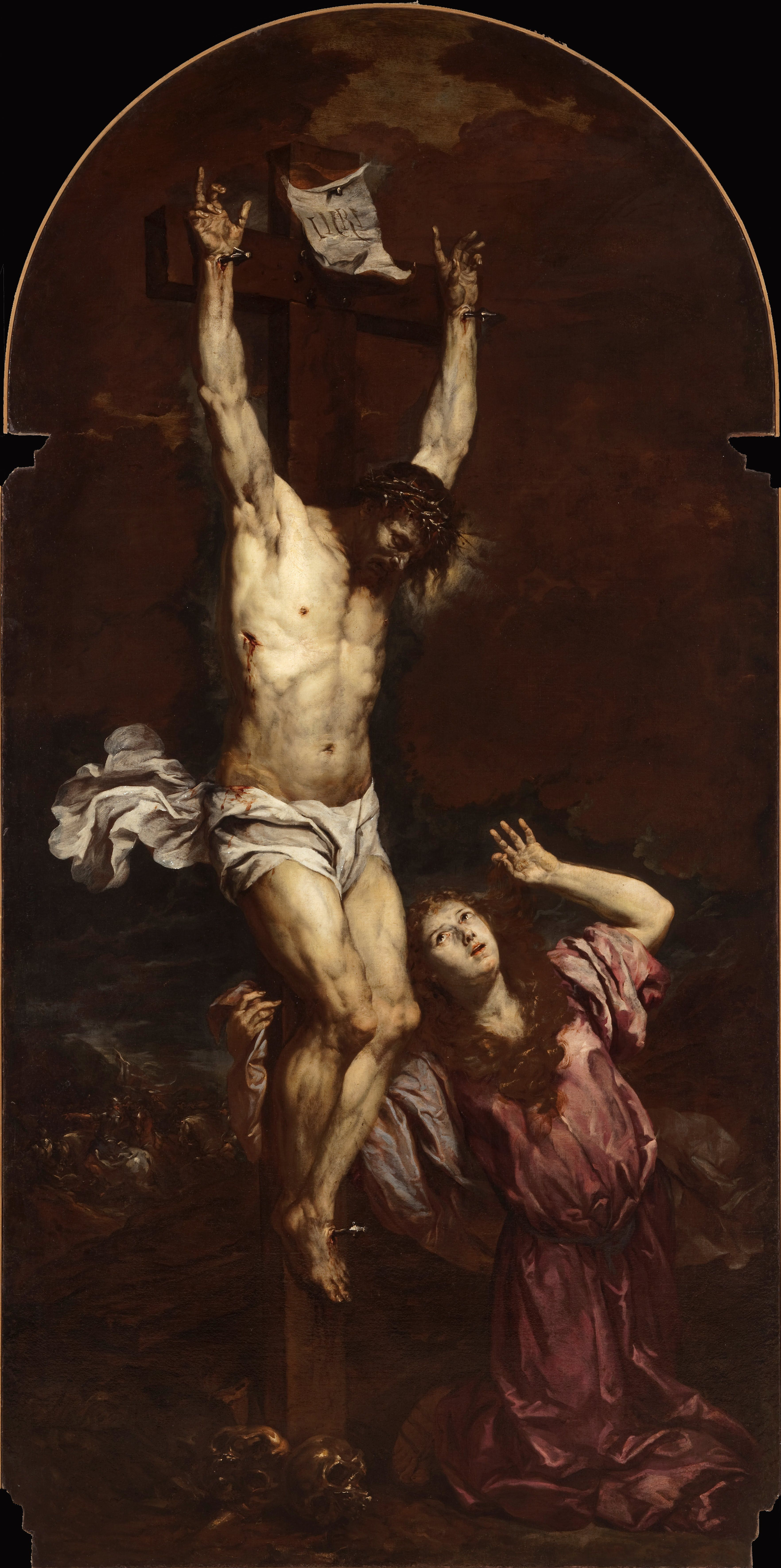
Mary Magdalene at the foot of the Cross, 1663–1664, Museum of 18th-century Venice

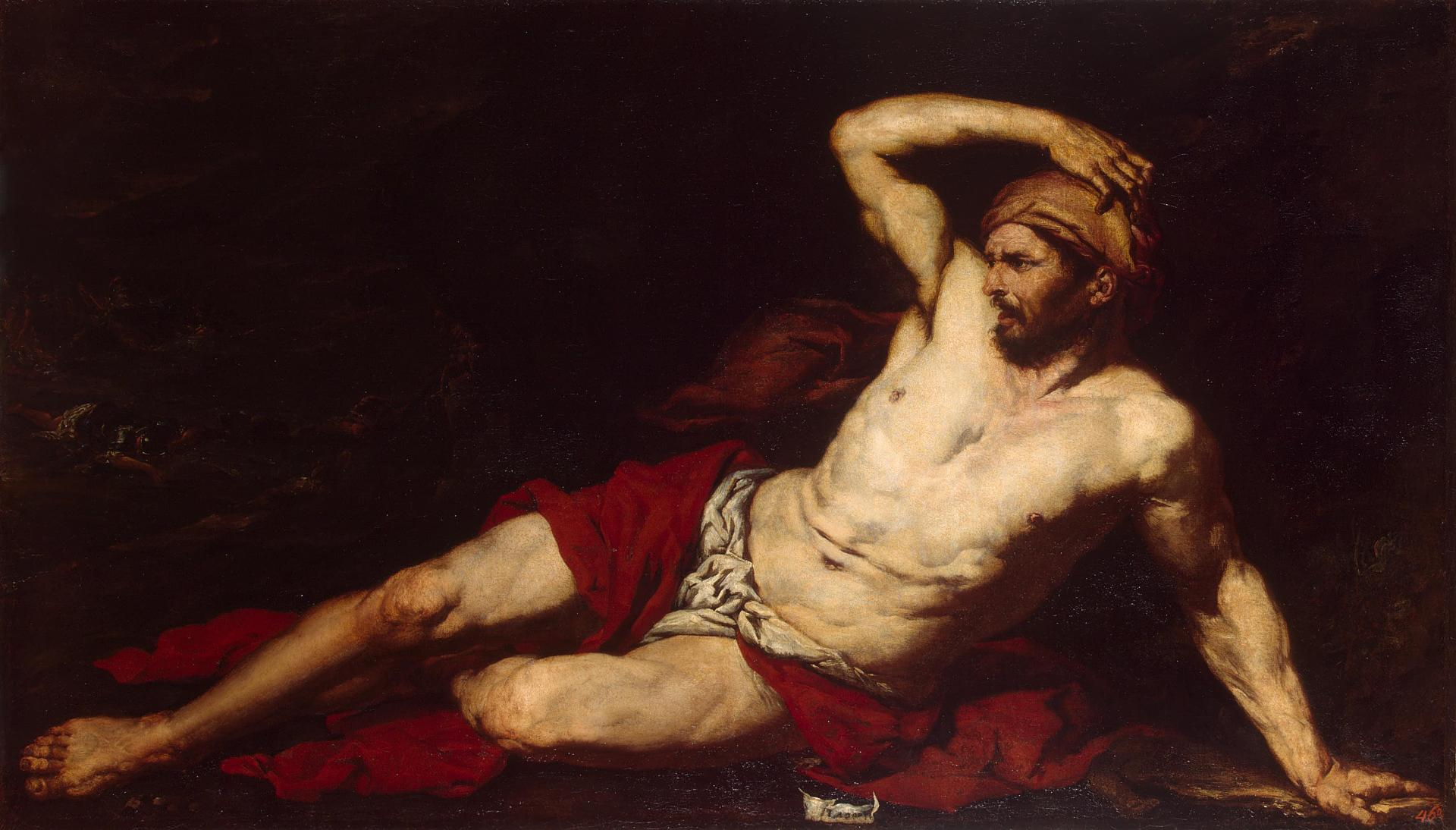
Samson, c. 1660, Hermitage Museum, Saint Petersburg

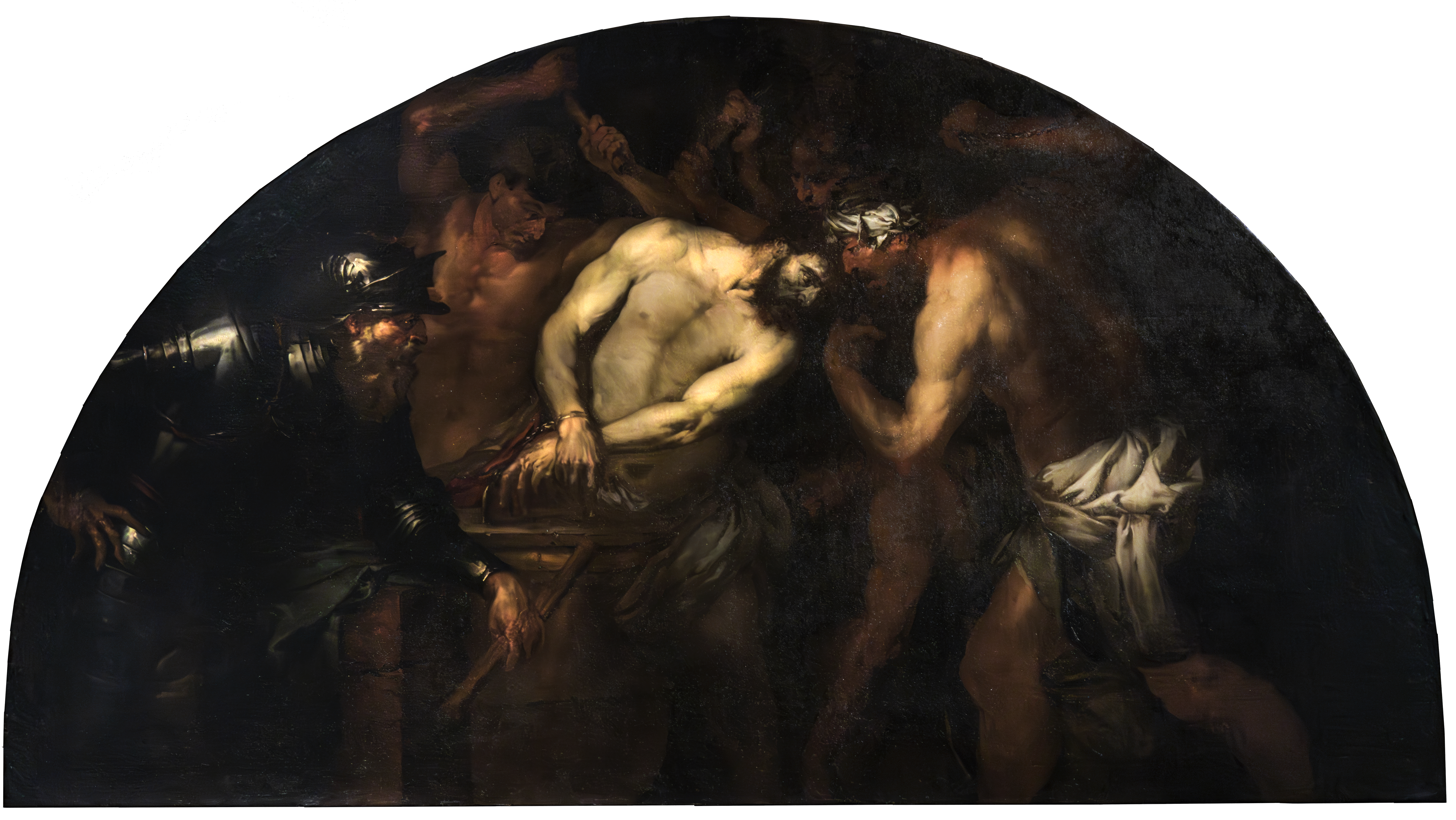
Christ at the Column, c. 1665, Gallerie dell'Accademia, Venice

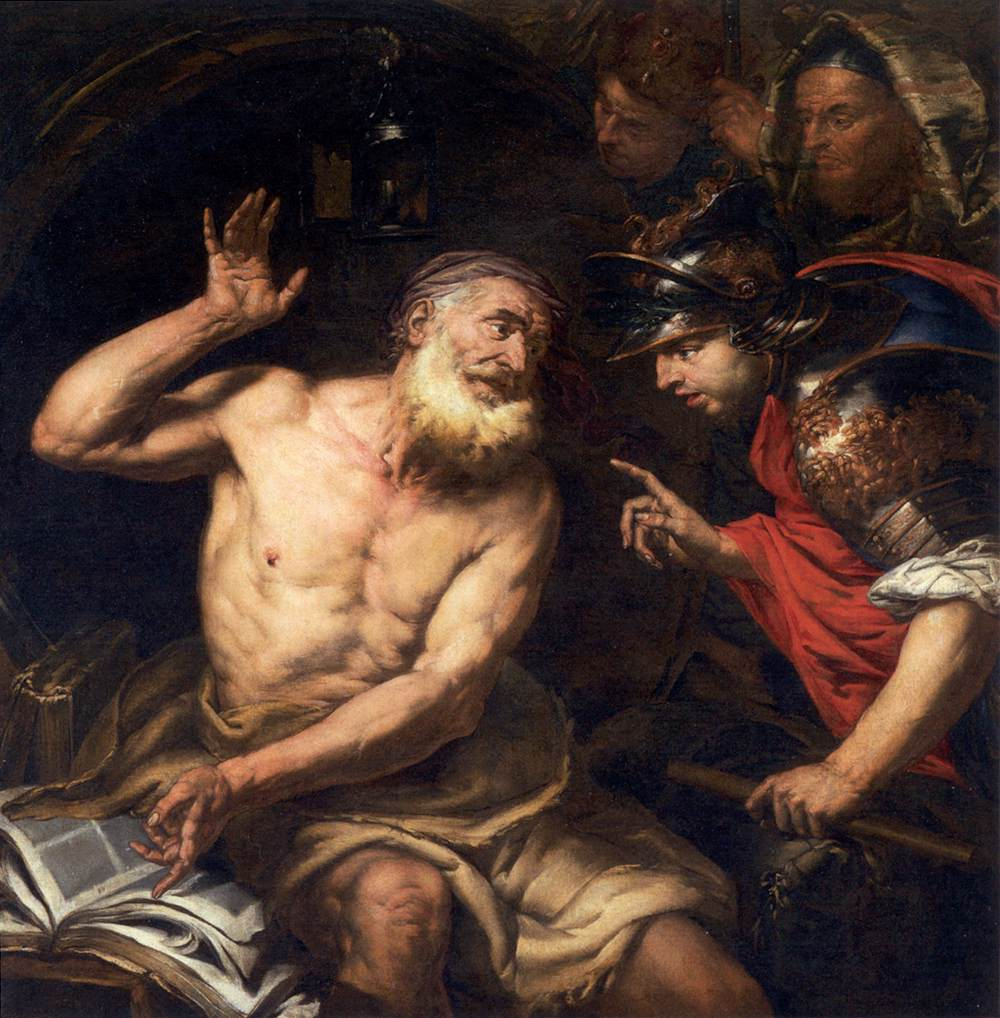
Diogenes and Alexander, c. 1650, Pinacoteca Querini Stampalia, Venice

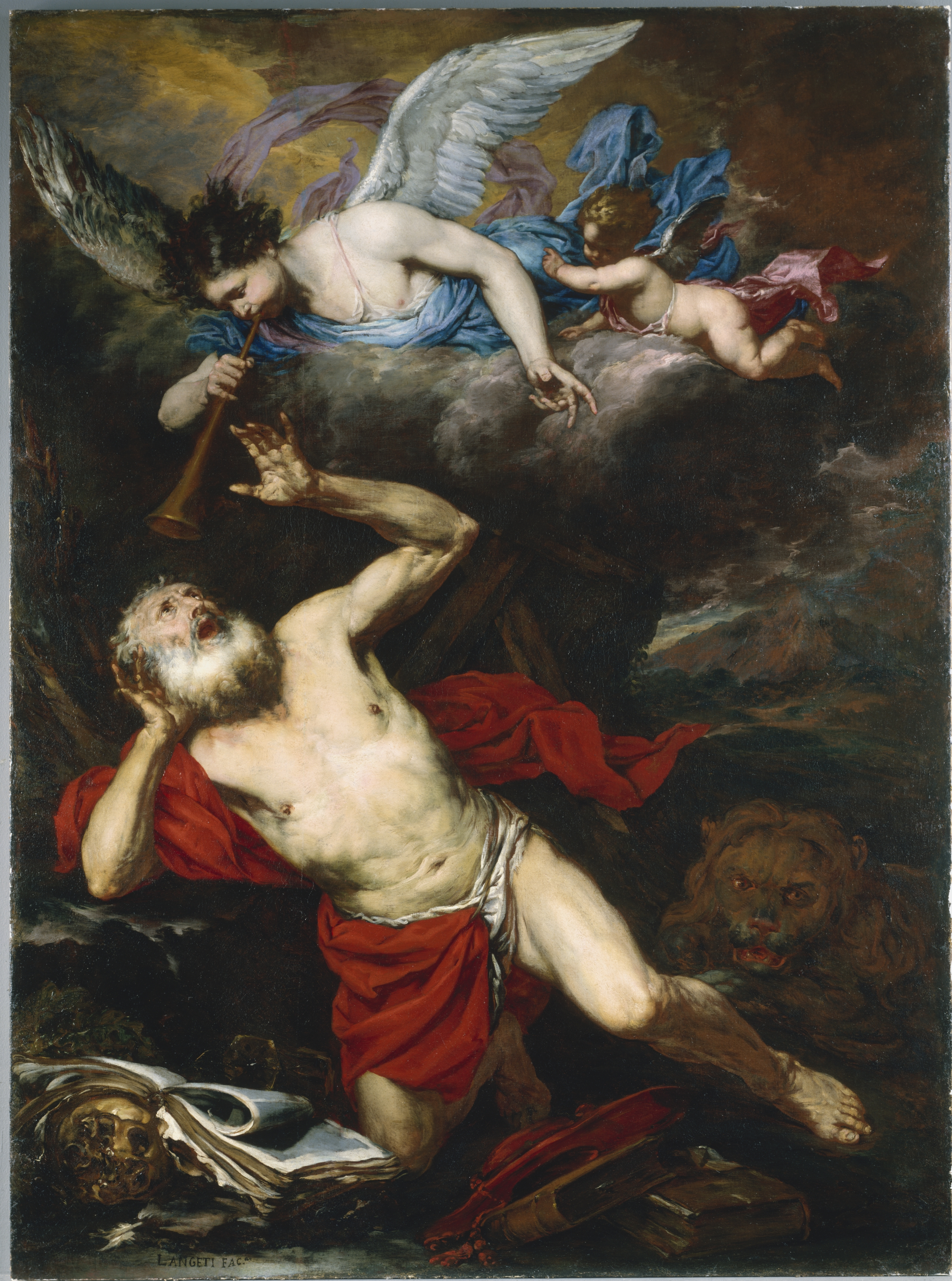
The Vision of Saint Jerome, Cleveland Museum of Art, Cleveland, Ohio
