= Maria Vittoria Cassana =

Italian artist (died 1711)

Maria Vittoria Cassana (died 1711) was an Italian painter of the late-Baroque. She was the daughter of Giovanni Francesco Cassana. She painted small pictures of religious subjects for private collections.

== See also ==
- Cassana (family)
