= Bonifazio Asioli =

Italian composer (1769–1832)

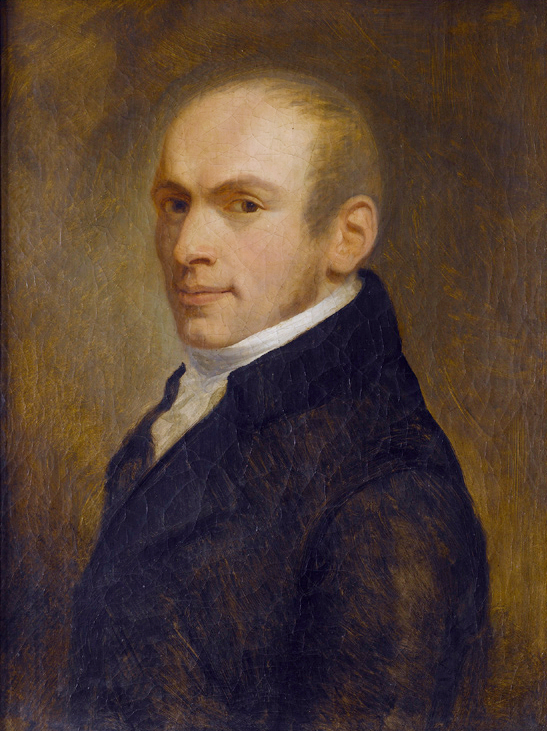
Bonifazio Asioli, by Andrea Appiani (1805)

Bonifazio Asioli (30 April 1769 – 26 May 1832) was an Italian composer of classical and church music.

== Biography ==
Born in Correggio, Asioli was a child prodigy, commencing his study of music at five years of age, and having composed several masses and a piano concerto by the age of eight. By the time he was eighteen, he had composed five masses, twenty-four other works for church and theatre, and many instrumental pieces. Later, Asioli became a student of Angelo Morigi.

Asioli is the author of theoretical treatises on music, which were published by Ricordi in Milan, and also a Trio for mandolin, violin and bass; a Duo for two voices with guitar accompaniment, published by Ricordi, and two methods for the guitar — a short one published by Ricordi and a more comprehensive work published by B. Girard & Co., of Naples. This latter work contained a diagram of the instrument and airs arranged for guitar solo. His treatise on contrabass playing, Elementi per il Contrabasso con una Nuova Maniera di Digitare (1823), developed a three-finger system which flourished in Italy in the mid-nineteenth century after it was promoted by Giuseppe Andreoli and others.

In 1787, he moved from Correggio to Turin, where he resided for nine years. In 1796, he accompanied the Duchess Gherardini to Venice, where he remained until 1799. He lived in Paris in 1810, in the service of the Empress Marie Louise, and remained there until the fall of the empire, when he returned to his native town.
