= Jacob van der Kerckhoven =

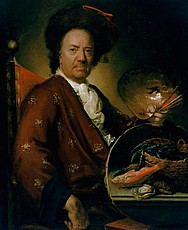
Self-portrait

Jacob van der Kerckhoven (or Jacques van de Kerckhoven), known in Italy as Giacomo da Castello (1636/1637 – after 1712), was a Flemish painter. After training in Antwerp, he was active in the Republic of Venice. He was one of the most prominent still life and animal specialists active in the Veneto territory around the start of the 18th century.

== Life ==
Jacob van der Kerckhoven was likely born in Antwerp in 1636 or 1637. He was registered at the Antwerp Guild of Saint Luke as a pupil of Jan Fyt in the year 1649–1650. Jan Fyt was one of the leading still life and animal painters active in Flanders at the time.

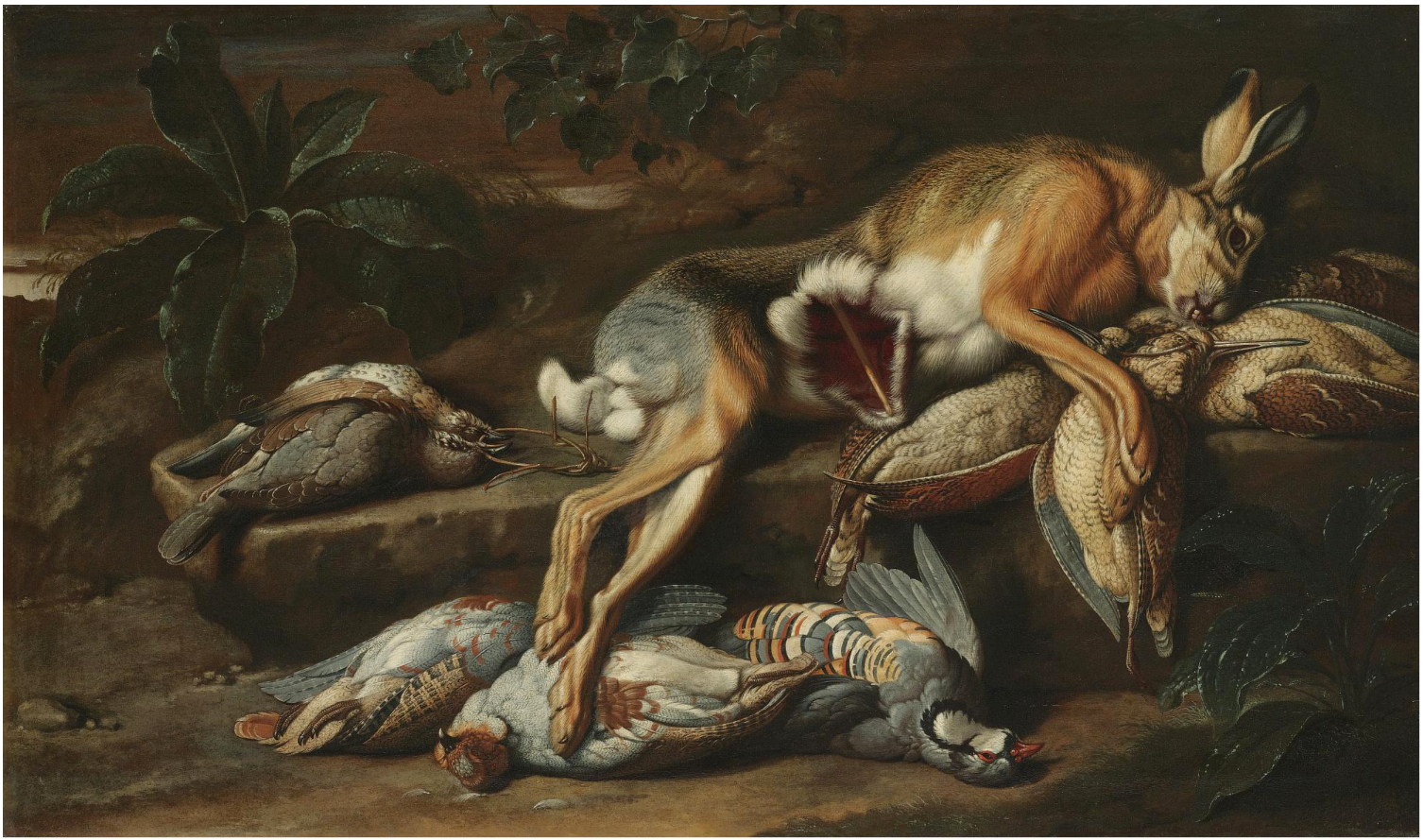
Still life with a hare and other dead game

Jacob van der Kerckhoven moved to Italy where he was first recorded in Venice in 1683. He changed his name to Giacomo da Castello after the Venetian district in which he lived. He became a very successful painter of still lifes with live animals and many of his works are listed in Venetian inventories from the 17th to 19th centuries. He became the court painter of the Doge of Venice. He was also patronized by English aristocrats on their Grand Tour such as John Cecil, 5th Earl of Exeter who commissioned in 1684 four paintings from van der Kerckhoven while in Padua (now in the collection of Burghley House, Lincolnshire, England).

He was active in Vicenza for several years. It is likely that he visited Rome and perhaps Naples since his work shows stylistic links with Michelangelo Cerquozzi and Michele Pace del Campidoglio. He was the teacher of Giovanni Agostino Cassana. From 1685 until 1712 he was registered at the Academy of Venice (Fraglia dei Pittori).

He died in Venice.

== Work ==
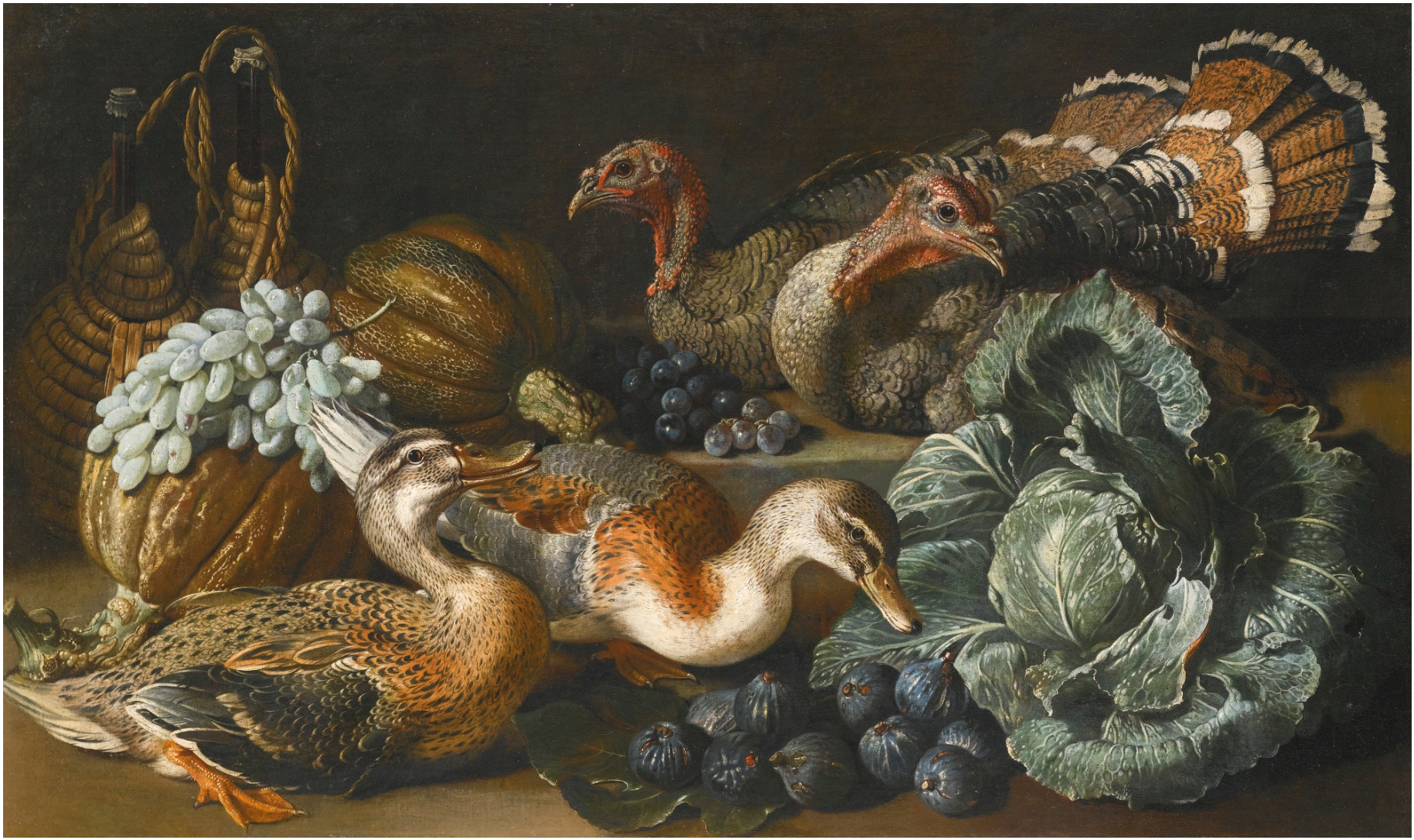
Still life of ducks, turkeys, melons, figs, grapes and a cabbage on a stone ledge

Van der Kerckhoven is believed to have started his career as a painter of landscapes and genre scenes. He soon developed a successful career as a specialist painter of fruit still lifes, hunting still lifes, game still lifes and scenes of animals. He had a particular interest in scenes and still lifes of fowl. He created his personal repertoire of small animals, including ducks, turkeys and even guinea pigs, accompanied by vegetables, fruits, vegetables and other popular foods, of great simplicity.

His work shows the influence of the Flemish and Italian schools of still life painting. From his Flemish training he retained an accurate precision in the description of details and qualities, both in animals and fruits or other foods. The Italian influence reveals itself in the bright Italian light, which he often tempered by the use of chiaroscuro. He painted large and ambitious compositions similar to those he had seen in the workshops of Antwerp and in the studio of his master Fyt while at the same time developing a personal language of almost naive charm.

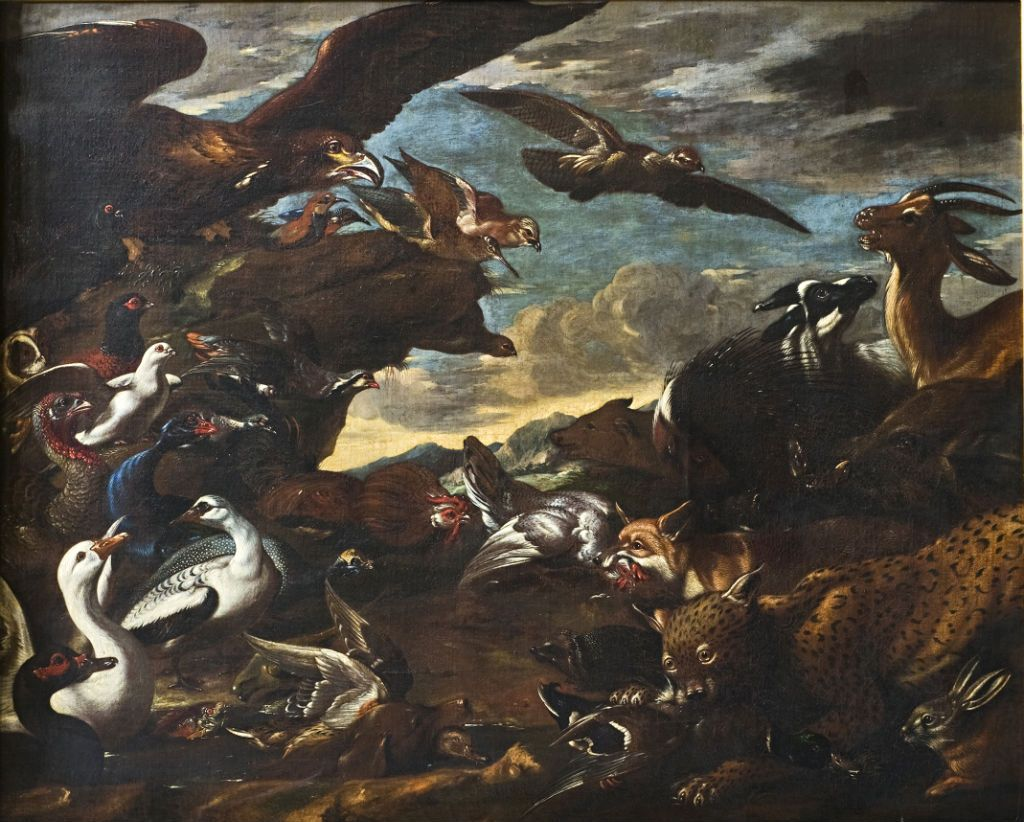
The battle of the birds and beasts

Some of his compositions are in the very dynamic Flemish Baroque style of still life painting. An example of this is The Battle of the birds and beasts (Collection of Burghley House, Lincolnshire, England), which represents a dynamic whirlwind of violence. At the same time he produced peaceful compositions, such as the Still life of birds and fruit (Auctioned at Setdart Subastas). His compositions use zigzags to create dynamic effects, while objects accumulate without any clear form.

Van der Kerckhoven moved away from Fyt's style and developed a personal manner characterized by analytical drawing and brilliant colour. He used very oily paint and was highly skilled in rendering the play of reflections. His works shows stylistic links with Michelangelo Cerquozzi and Michele Pace del Campidoglio. Contact with the work of Giovanni Battista Ruoppolo and also with Joseph Heintz the younger are reflected in his still-life paintings with fish as well as in the Self-portrait (Uffizi, Florence), a rare example of his figure painting. There exist doubt as to whether certain works (such as the Still life with fruit, Lower Saxony State Museum, Hannover) were painted by him or by Giuseppe Recco.

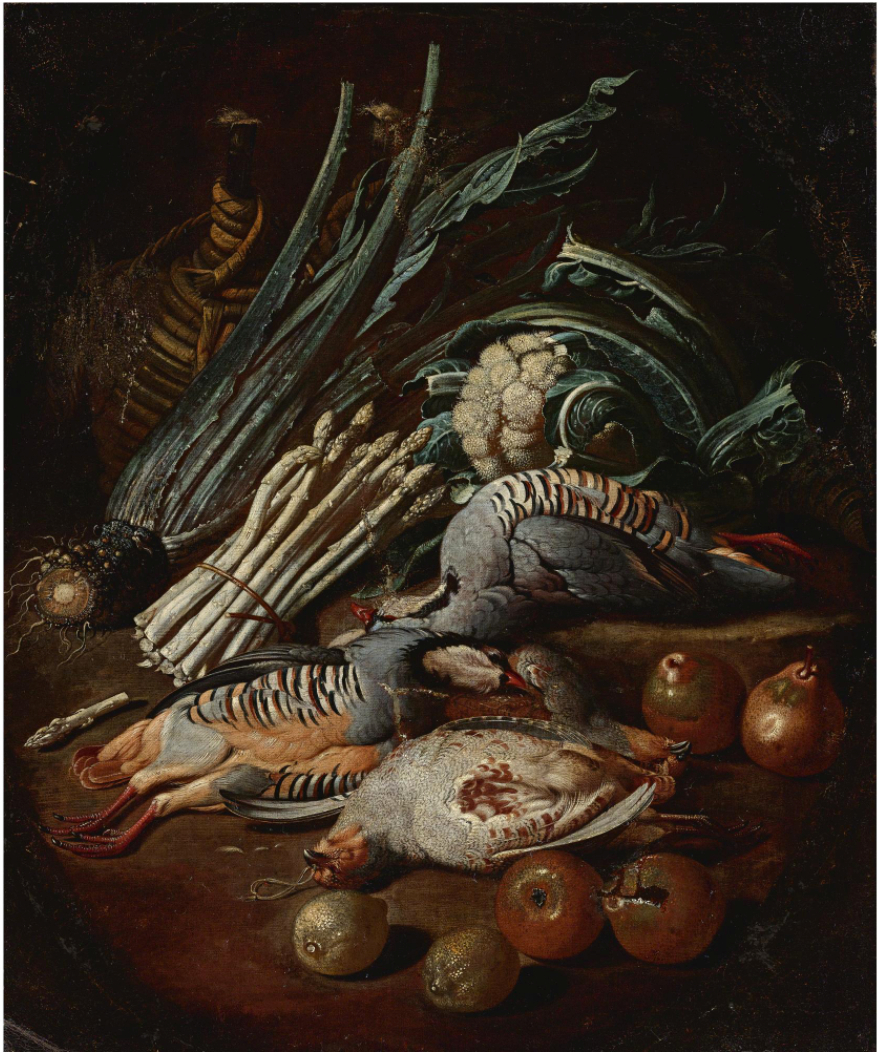
Still life with birds, fruit and vegetables

Van der Kerckhoven is known to have collaborated with figure painters such as Johann Carl Loth and Antonio Zanchi on compositions to which he contributed the still-life elements.
