= Cassana =

The Cassana were a family of Italian Baroque painters of the 17th and early 18th centuries.

Notable family members included:

- Giovanni Francesco Cassana (1611–1691), baroque painter of the Genovese school.
- Abbate Giovanni Agostino Cassana (1658–1720), son of Giovanni Francesco
- Niccolò Cassana or Nicoletto (1659–1714), son of Giovanni Francesco
- Giovanni Battista Cassana (1668–1738), son of Giovanni Francesco
- Maria Vittoria Cassana (d. 1711), sister or daughter of Giovanni Francesco
