= Attilio Andreoli =

Italian painter (1877–1950)

Attilio Andreoli (7 April 1877 – 9 November 1950) was an Italian painter, depicting portraits, genre, and sacred subjects. He painted in oil and watercolor, often in a realist style.

== Biography ==
He was born in Chiari near Brescia. He was raised in an orphanage, and later studied under Giuseppe Bertini, Vespasiano Bignami, and Cesare Tallone at the Brera Academy. His first success was his painting of Rispha che protegge i corpi dei suoi figli, awarded 4000 lire in 1900. In 1903 his Christ and the Adulterer won an award in Milan. He completed in 1903 a cycle of mural decorations in the church of the Frati Minori, in via Farini in Milan, in 1906, his triptych, depicting Lotta di elementi, was exhibited at the National Exhibition at the Brera. In 1903, his painting of L'adultera was also awarded a monetary prize. In 1906, he helped decorate the sanctuary of Sant'Antonio di Padova in Milan. In 1917, he won a gold medal with The Violinist. He was an honorary associate at the Brera Academy, even after he retired to Cannobio (Italy; province of Verbano-Cusio-Ossola). He died in 1950 in Cavaglio-Spoccia, Province of Verbano-Cusio-Ossola.

His works can be found Galleria d’arte Moderna of Milan, two portraits at the Ospedale Maggiore, Sanctuary of Sant'Antonio di Padova of Milan; and in the Galleria d’arte moderna Ricci Oddi of Piacenza (self-portrait), and in Pinacoteca of Chiari.
