= Jan Fyt =

Flemish Baroque painter, draughtsman and etcher (1609–1661)

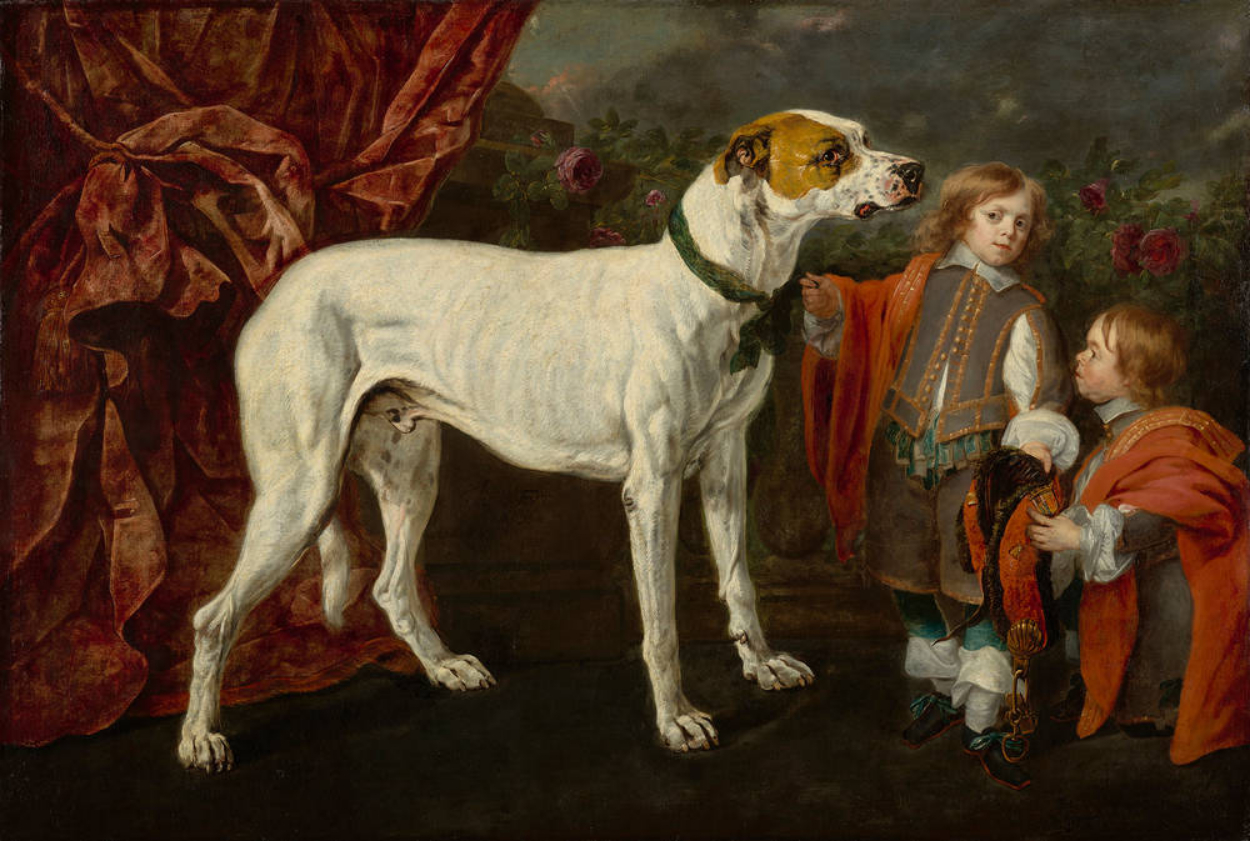
Big dog, dwarf and boy, 1652

Jan Fijt, Jan Fijt or Johannes Fijt (or Fyt) (19 August 1609 – 11 September 1661) was a Flemish Baroque painter, draughtsman and etcher. One of the leading still life and animaliers of the 17th century, he was known for his refined flower and fruit still lives, depictions of animals, garland painting and lush hunting pieces, and combinations of these subgenres, such as game, flowers and fish under a festoon of flowers. He was probably the master of the prominent Pieter Boel, who worked in a style very similar to that of Fyt.

== Life ==
Jan Fyt was born in Antwerp as the son of a wealthy merchant originally from Sint-Niklaas. In 1621 Fyt was registered at the Antwerp Guild of St Luke as an apprentice of Hans van den Berghe (also referred to as 'Jan van den Bergh'), a Dutch painter and draughtsman who had trained with Goltzius in Haarlem and later with Rubens in Antwerp. Fyt then likely completed his training with the leading Antwerp animal painter Frans Snyders from 1629 to 1631. He became a master of the Antwerp Guild of St Luke in the guild year 1630–31.

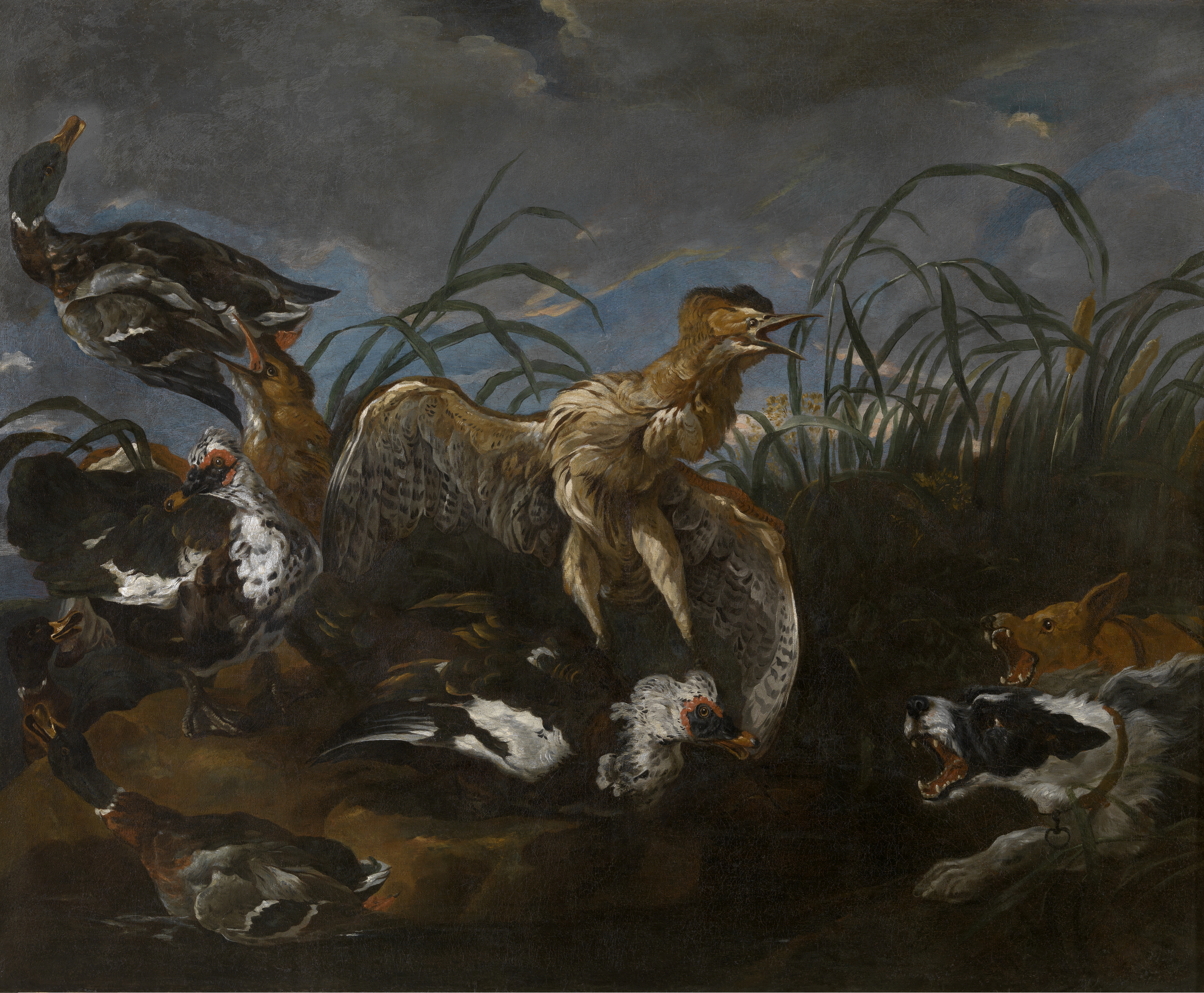
Bittern and ducks startled by dogs

After setting out on a trip to Southern Europe in 1633, Fyt stopped for a while in Paris. He traveled on to Italy the following year. He worked in Venice for the prominent Sagredo and Contarini families. He resided in Rome in 1635. Here he joined the Bentvueghels, an association of mainly Dutch and Flemish artists working in Rome. It was customary for the Bentvueghels to adopt an appealing nickname, the so-called 'bent name'. Fyt was reportedly given the bent name 'Goudvink' ('bullfinch').

During his stay in Italy, he most likely also visited Naples, Florence and Genoa. The Italian art historian Pellegrino Antonio Orlandi stated in his Abecedario pittorico of 1704 that Fyt also spent time in Spain and London.

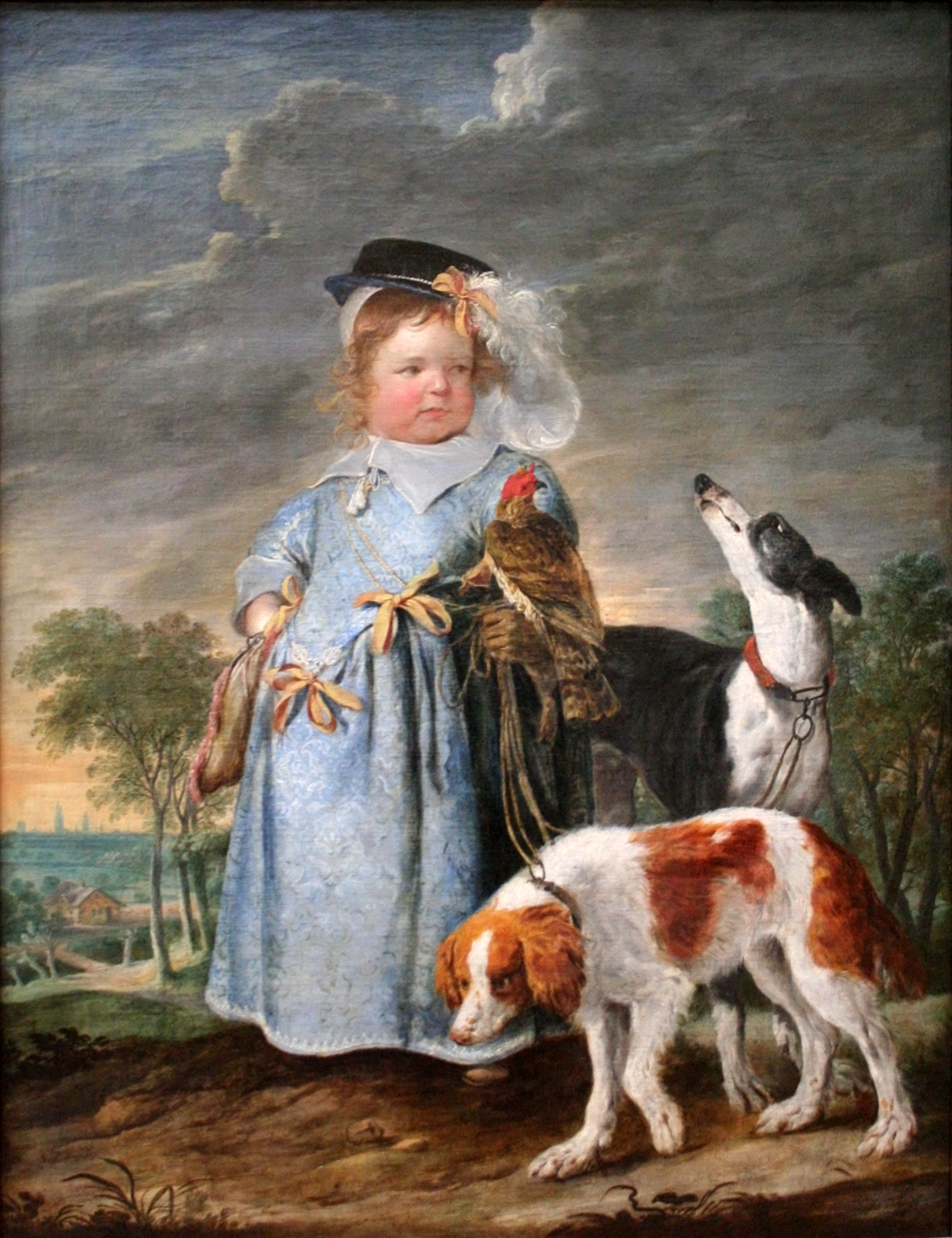
Portrait of a boy, a collaboration with Erasmus Quellinus I

By 1641 Fyt is recorded back in Antwerp where he remained active for the remainder of his life aside from a brief trip to the Dutch Republic which he is believed to have made that same year. Fyt ran a successful studio in Antwerp which produced many copies of his creations. He became a wealthy man and maintained a network of contacts with patrons and art dealers both at home and abroad. He was frequently mentioned in judicial documents in Antwerp in relation to disputes and court cases with other painters and members of his own family over money.

Fyt joined the Guild of Romanists in 1650. The Guild of Romanists was a society of notables and artists which was active in Antwerp from the 16th to 18th century. It was a condition of membership that the member had visited Rome. In the year 1652 the Guild chose Fyt as its dean.

Fyt married Françoise van de Sande on 22 March 1654 and the couple had four children. He died in Antwerp on 11 September 1661.

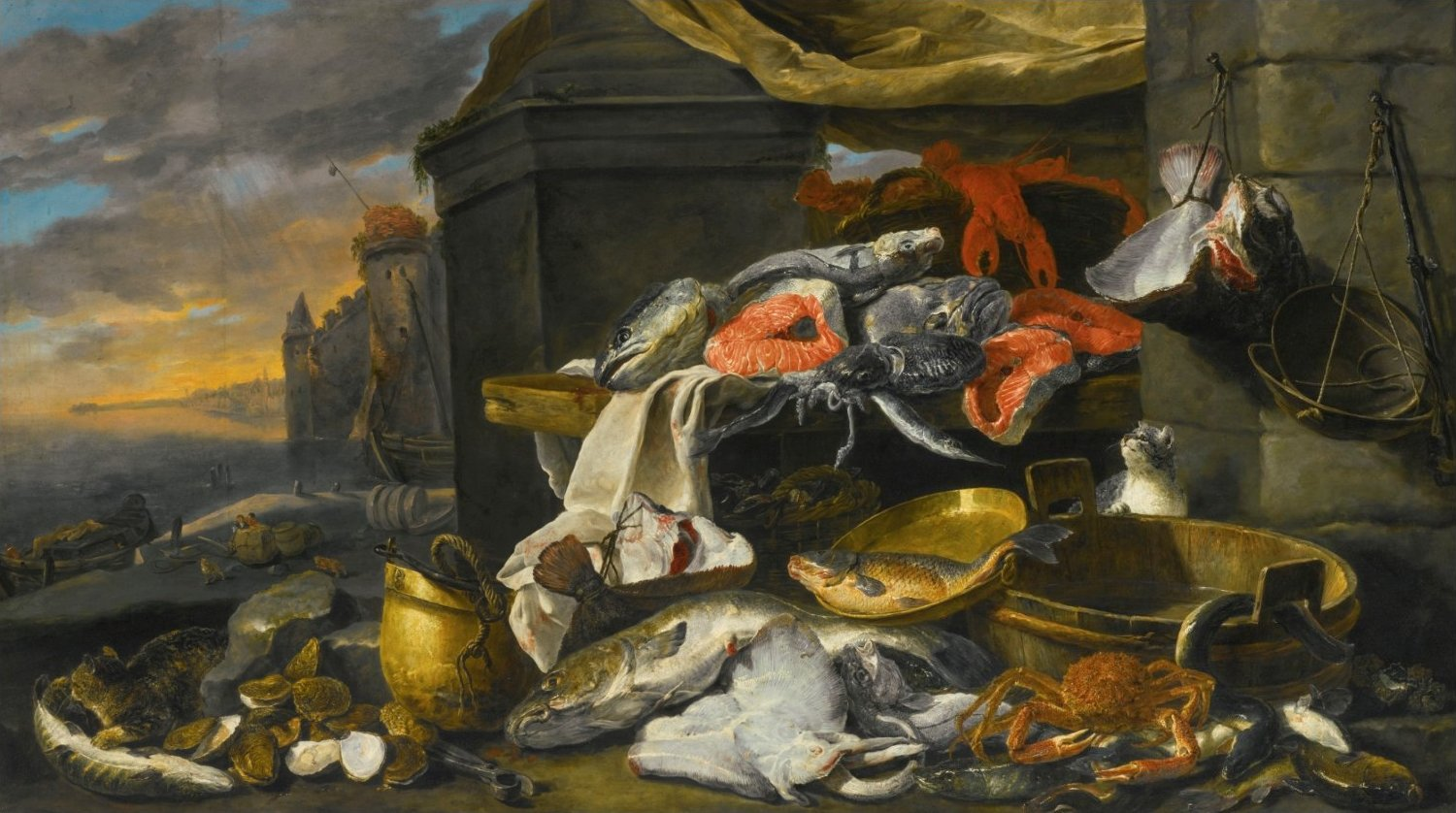
Seafood with cats, a tub, a copper dish and a bucket and baskets in a landscape

Fyt's pupils included Pieter Boel and Jacob van der Kerckhoven, who both had successful careers abroad. Pieter Boel's style remained very close to Fyt's.

== Work ==
=== General ===
Fyt was a versatile still-life specialist. Although better known for his hunting, game and animal pieces he also painted beautiful still life compositions with flowers and fruit. He was very prolific and is believed to have produced around 380 paintings, many of them signed and dated. His works were sought after by important art collectors of his day and are now in the collections of many leading international museums. Most of his work is signed as 'Joannes FYT' and dated. His dated work was made in the years 1638 to 1661.

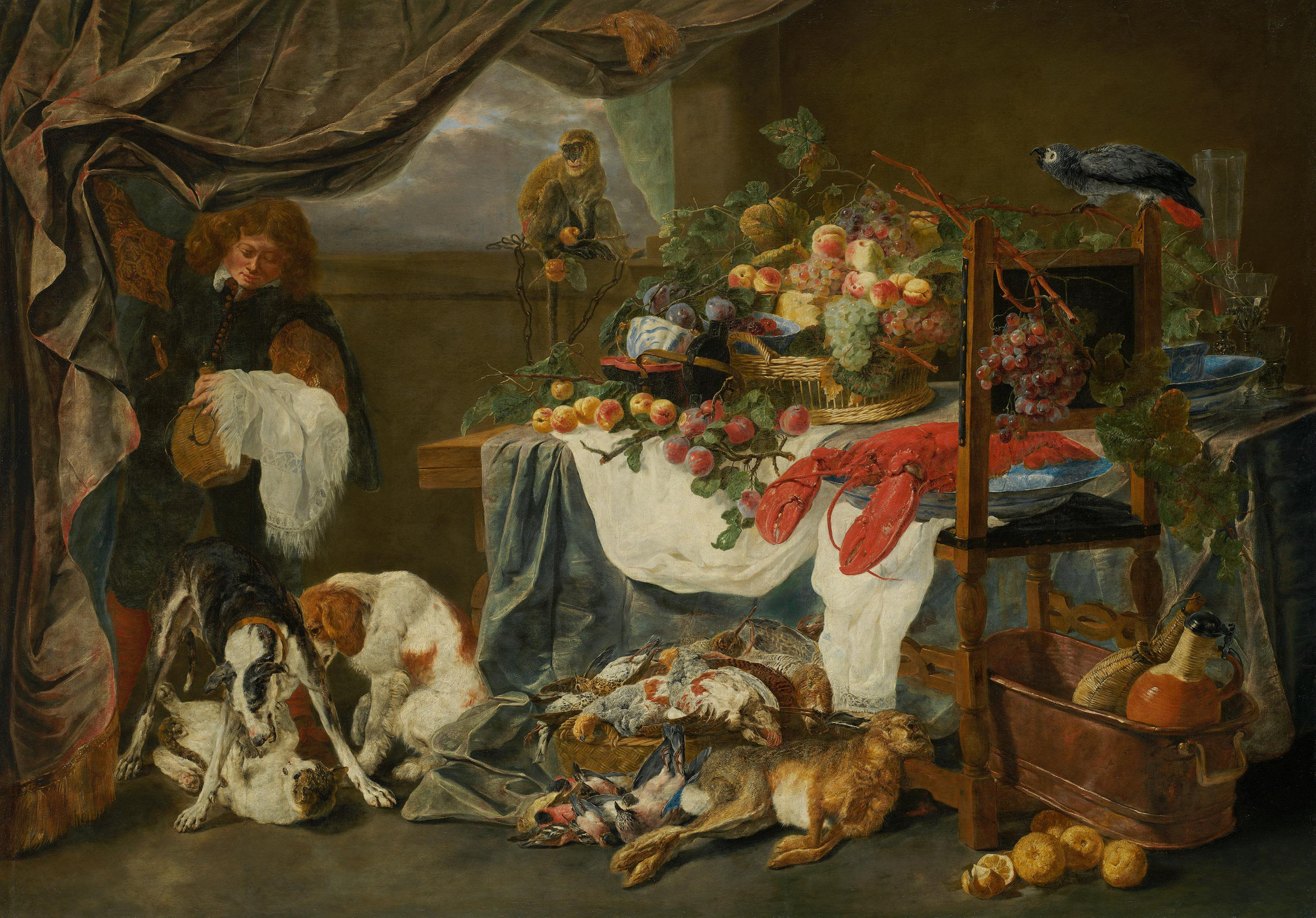
Still life with hunting prey and fruit

=== Animal still lifes ===
Fyt's animal still lifes are generally more refined than those of Frans Snyders as he catered primarily to the tastes of an aristocratic clientele. His palette was likely influenced by his exposure to Italian art and was more striking than that of Snyders. His works show gradually more dynamic movement and asymmetry. Fyt's frenetic nervous brushstrokes, and his freer and more Baroque compositional style differed also from those of Snyders. Fyt was particularly skilled in the delicate rendering of the various textures of the fur and plumage of the animals he depicted.

=== Hunting pieces ===
Fyt innovated the genre of the hunting piece by moving the scene in which the dead game was displayed from an indoor table top to an open landscape.

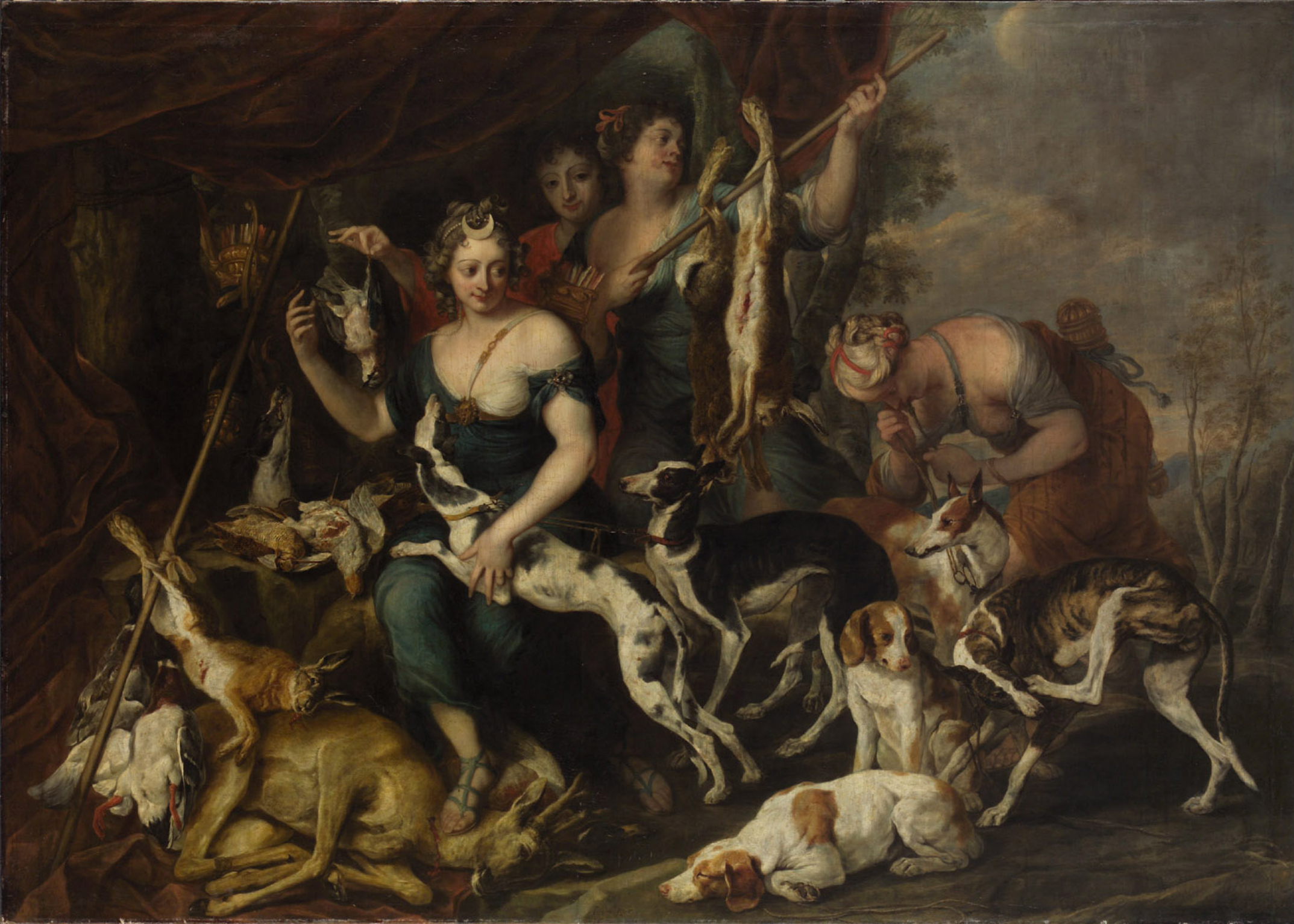
Diana's hunt, collaboration with Thomas Willeboirts Bosschaert

He was the first artist to depict game as a subject of hunting rather than as food displayed in a home or kitchen. He did not place fruit and vegetables in his game pieces but rather dogs forming part of the hunting scene in an outdoor landscape. As the game was no longer shown as food but as a trophy, these works have been referred to as trophy pieces. This new approach to the display of game as part of the hunt caused Fyt to include hunting equipment and tools in these works. Hounds play an important role in these pieces and together with the hunting equipment they point to the proximity of the master. Fyt occasionally included portraits of individuals and families in these game pieces. While hunting was at the time still a pastime reserved for the aristocracy, the well-off urban elite were eager to acquire Fyt's game pieces to decorate their houses with these tokens of a lifestyle only open to aristocrats.

Some of his game pieces display the scene as if seen through the eyes of an animal witnessing the scene. An example is the Dead Game and Weasels (c. 1642, Detroit Institute of Arts). The adoption of the animal viewpoint has been interpreted as Fyt's reflection on new philosophical and scientific ideas on the differences and similarities between animal and human consciousness that were developed in 17th-century Europe.

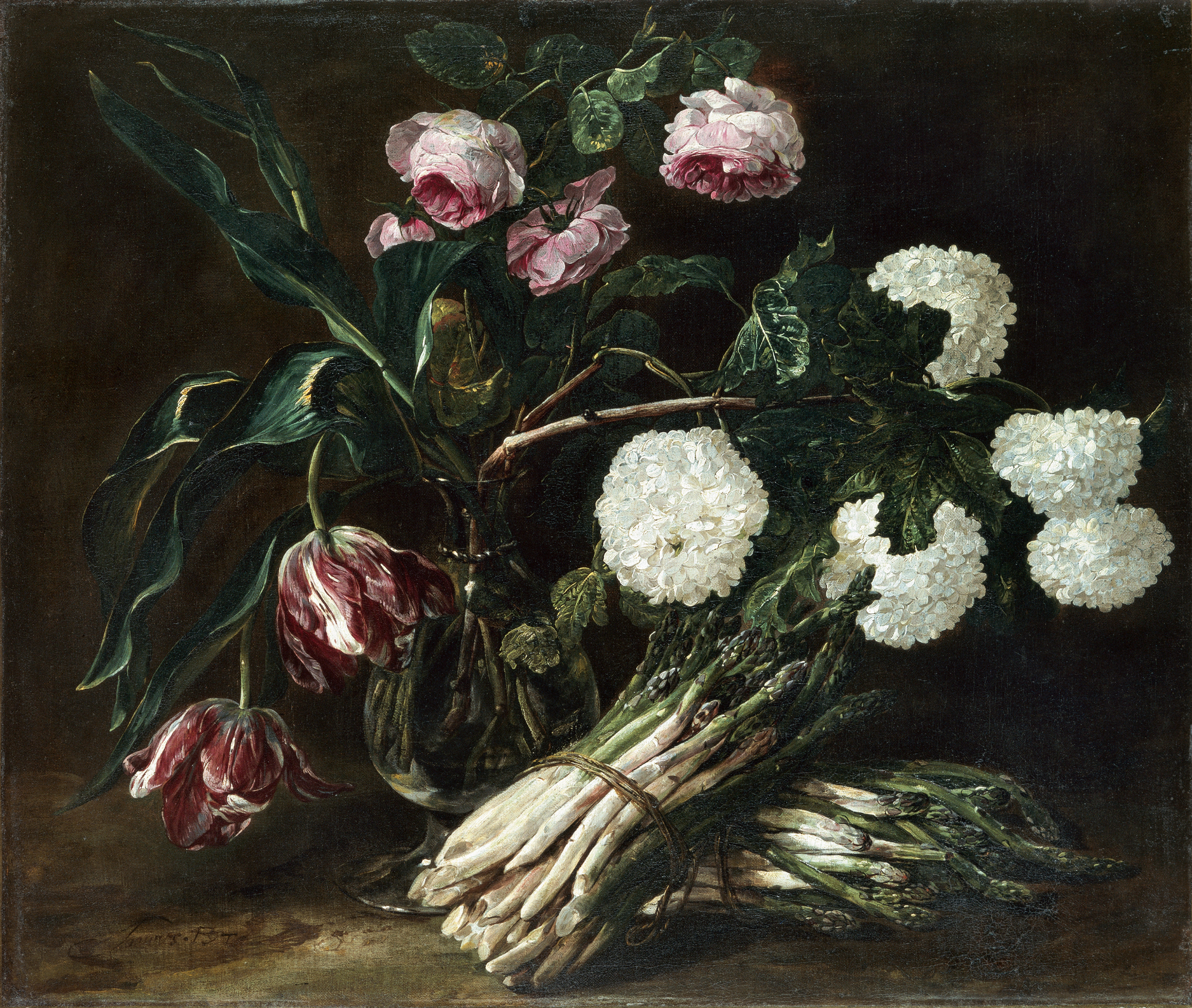
Vase of Flowers and two Bunches of Asparagus

Fyt's innovative game pieces were influential on artists practicing the genre in France and the Dutch Republic.

=== Flower pieces ===
Fyt created flower pieces in the later part of his career from 1643 onwards. He depicted large flowers with drooping blooms, such as peonies, tulips with other flowers extending high above them. The pieces are typically arranged in a vase. In a few works the vase seems to have fallen over or is placed on an architectural element. Fyt uses fairly broad and fluid brushstrokes, in places with impasto. His choice of palette is careful and more tonal than that of his master Snyders. He also relies on chiaroscuro effects.

== Collaborations ==
As was the custom in Antwerp at the time, Fyt collaborated regularly with other painters who were specialist in other areas such as figure, landscape or architectural painting. He thus relied on figure painters such as Cornelius Schut, Thomas Willeboirts Bosschaert and possibly on occasion Jacob Jordaens and on figure and architectural painters such as Erasmus Quellinus II.

== Drawings ==
Jan Fyt produced many drawings of animals based usually on studies from nature. The Hermitage holds a large gouache drawing of a Fox Hunt. It is rich in colour and carefully executed and was likely intended as a model for tapestry cartoon.

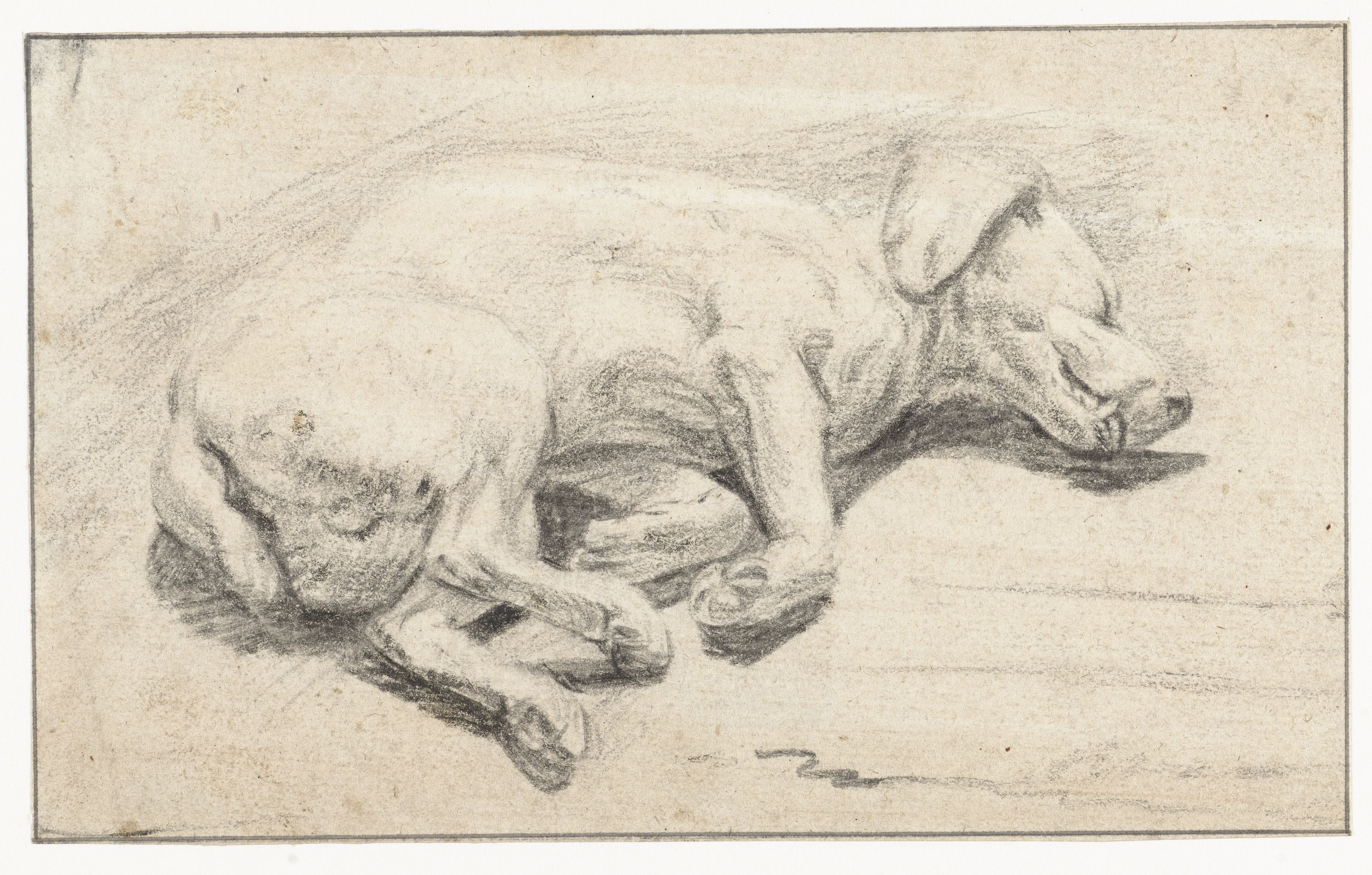
Sleeping dog

== Engravings ==
Fyt was an accomplished etcher and he produced a series of etchings depicting mainly animals and dogs. These were published in his lifetime in two sets referred to respectively as the Set of the Dogs and the Set of the Animals. The set of 8 prints of the Dogs series was published in 1642. The title plate shows two hunting dogs in front of a pedestal with a dedication to the Spanish Don Carlo Guasco, Marquess of Soleno who was the patron of the publication. The other plates show dogs in the middle of various activities and situations.

The Set of the Animals comprised 8 prints depicting respectively billy goats, an ox, a horse, a recumbent dog, a recumbent cow, a wagon near a tree, a recumbent cow and two foxes.
