= Evangelista Andreoli =

Italian musician (1810–1875)

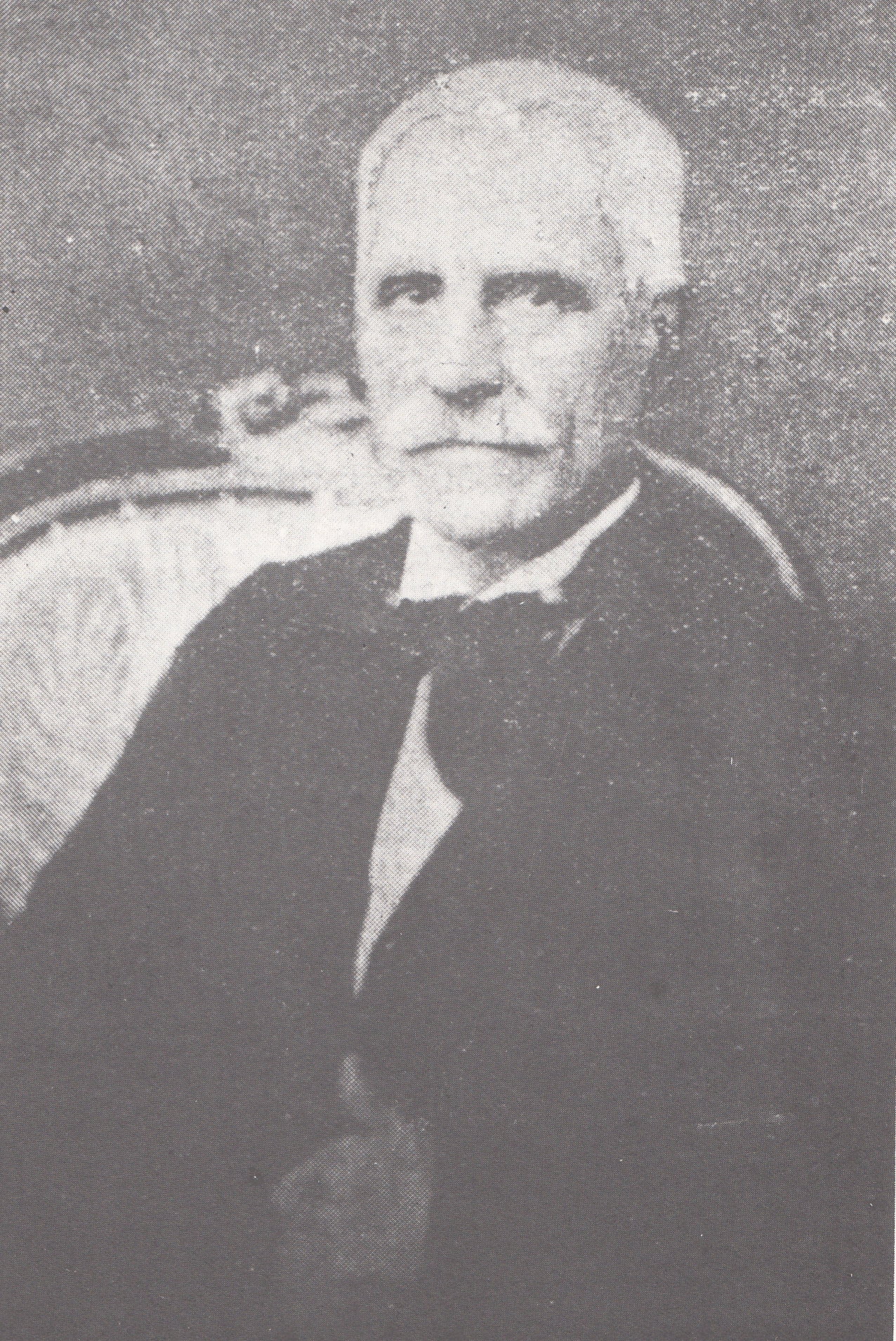
Evangelista Andreoli

Evangelista Andreoli (27 June 1810 – 16 June 1875) was an Italian organist, pianist, and teacher.

Born in Disvetro (now in the comune Cavezzo), Modena, he moved to nearby Mirandola, where he played organ and taught at the music school for his entire life. He was crippled in both legs, but was able to play the pedal keyboard of the organ through a special device that he constructed.

He was the father of a musical family, including the notable sons Guglielmo the Elder (1835-1860), Carlo (1840-1908), and Guglielmo the Younger (1862-1932). He also had another son with the name Evangelista (1845-1867), who was also a pianist and teacher.
