= Ezequiel Andreoli =

Argentine footballer

Personal information
- Date of birth: March 25, 1978 (age 48)
- Place of birth: Haedo, Buenos Aires, Argentina
- Height: 1.77 m (5 ft 10 in)
- Position: Defender

Senior career*
Years	Team	Apps	(Gls)
1998–1999	Huracán	2	(0)
2000–2001	Banfield	9	(0)
2001–2002	Independiente Rivadavia	23	(0)
2002	→ Tigre (loan)	16	(1)
2003	Huachipato	3	(0)
2004	All Boys	17	(0)
2005	The Strongest	–	(–)
2005–2006	Atlanta	20	(0)
2006–2007	Sport Boys	42	(1)
2008–2009	Juan Aurich	25	(0)
2010–2011	Temperley	21	(2)
2011–2012	Sarmiento de Leones	2	(0)
Medal record
First place	Primera Nacional	2001
Second place	Bolivian Primera División - Adecuación	2005
- * Club domestic league appearances and goals

Fernando Ezequiel Andreoli (born March 25, 1978) is an Argentine former footballer who played for teams from Chile, Bolivia and Peru, as well as his native Argentina. He played as a right full-back.

== Teams ==
- (Argentina) Huracán: 1997–1998
- (Argentina) Banfield: 1999–2001
- (Argentina) Independiente Rivadavia: 2001–2002
- (Argentina) Tigre: 2002
- (Chile) Huachipato: 2003
- (Argentina) All Boys: 2004
- (Bolivia) The Strongest: 2005
- (Argentina) Atlanta: 2005–2006
- (Peru) Sport Boys: 2006–2007
- (Peru) Juan Aurich: 2008–2009
- (Argentina) Temperley: 2010–2011
- (Argentina) Sarmiento de Leones: 2011–2012

== Titles ==
- Banfield: 2000–01 (Primera B)
