= Giovanni Battista Cassana =

Italian painter (1668–1738)

Giovanni Battista Cassana (1668–1738) was an Italian painter. He was born the youngest son of Giovanni Francesco Cassana. He excelled in painting fruit, flowers, and still-life.

== See also ==
- Cassana (family)
