= Niccolò Cassana =

Italian painter (1659 – c. 1713)

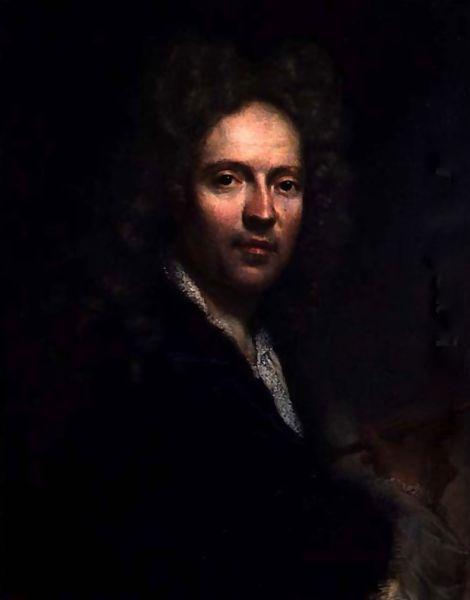
Self-portrait of Niccolò Cassana, c. 1695

Niccolò Cassana (often called Nicoletto; 1659 – c. 1713) was an Italian painter, primarily of portraits, born in Venice, Republic of Venice and active during the late-Baroque. His older brother Giovanni Agostino Cassana was also a painter.

He trained with his father, Giovanni Francesco Cassana, a painter originally from the Republic of Genoa, who had been taught the art of painting by Bernardo Strozzi. Early on in his career he produced a large amount of portraits in Venice. In 1681 he sent a self-portrait to Florence in a bid to become the new official court painter for the Grand Duchy of Tuscany. His painting was not viewed favorably and was relegated to a storeroom.

Cassana did however later move to the Grand Duchy of Tuscany and paint many portraits there. He also worked as a copying and restoring paintings for Grandduke Ferdinand II of the Grand Duchy of Tuscany. Cassana painted a Conspiracy of Catiline for the Gallery at Florence.

Having painted portraits of the Medici court, and also of some of the English nobility, Cassana was invited to England, and introduced to Queen Anne, who sat to him for her likeness, and conferred on him many marks of favor. He died in London in 1713 or 1714, (Note: The Royal Collection Trust gives his death as 1713, other sources such as the 1911 Encyclopedia Britannica give 1714.) having given way to drinking in his later years.

One of his pupils was Fortunato Pasquetti.

== See also ==
- Cassana (family)

== Sources ==
- Hobbes, James R. (1849). Picture collector's manual adapted to the professional man, and the amateur. T&W Boone. p. 46.
- Bryan, Michael (1886). Robert Edmund Graves (ed.). Dictionary of Painters and Engravers, Biographical and Critical. Vol. I: A-K. London: George Bell and Sons. p. 247.

== Gallery ==
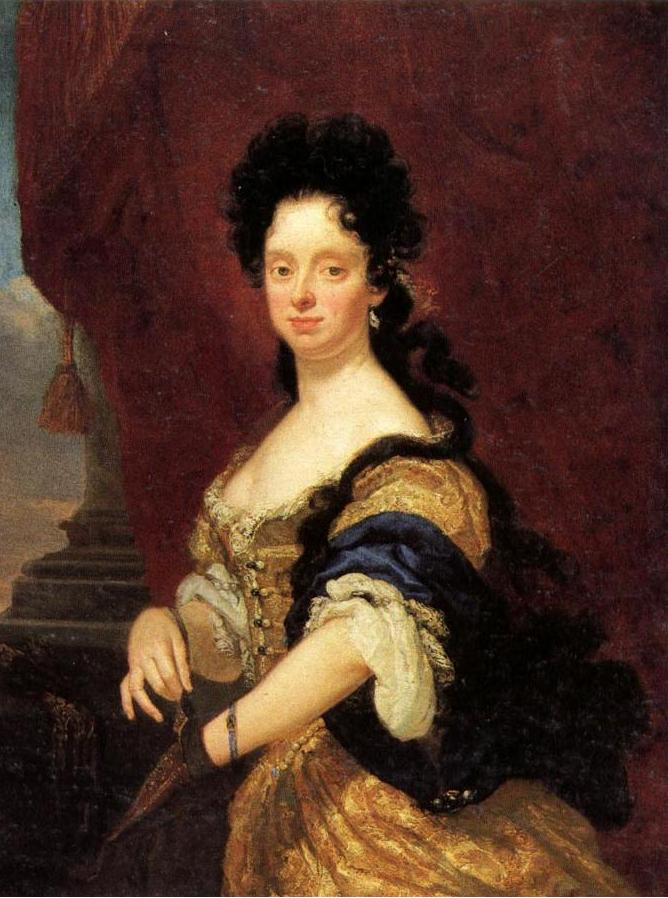
Anna Maria Luisa de' Medici

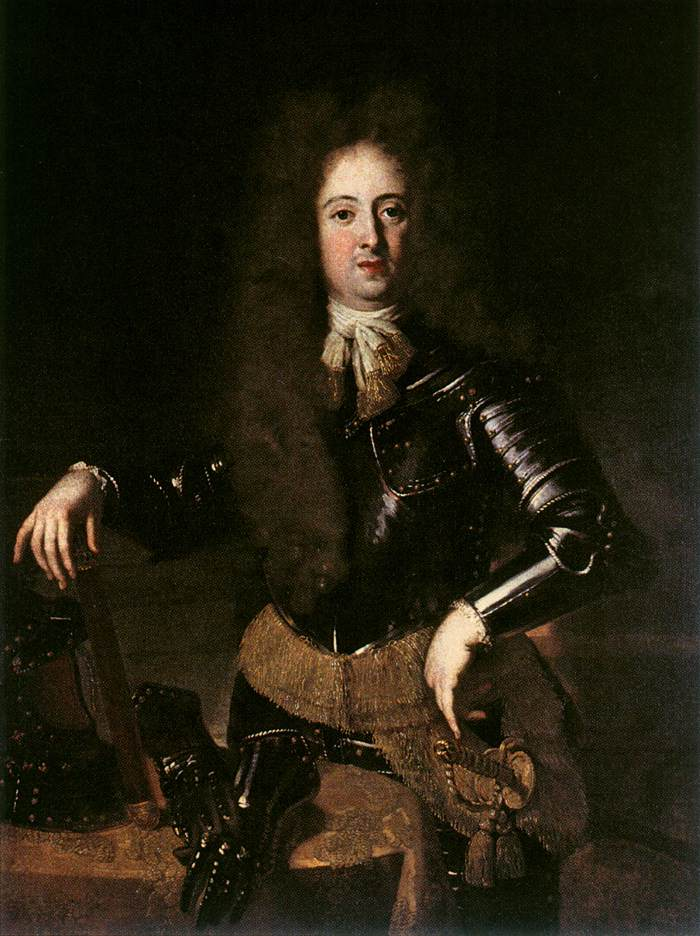
Grand Prince Ferdinando de' Medici (1690s)

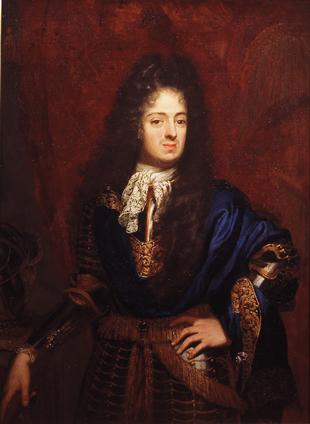
Grand Prince Ferdinando de' Medici (1687)

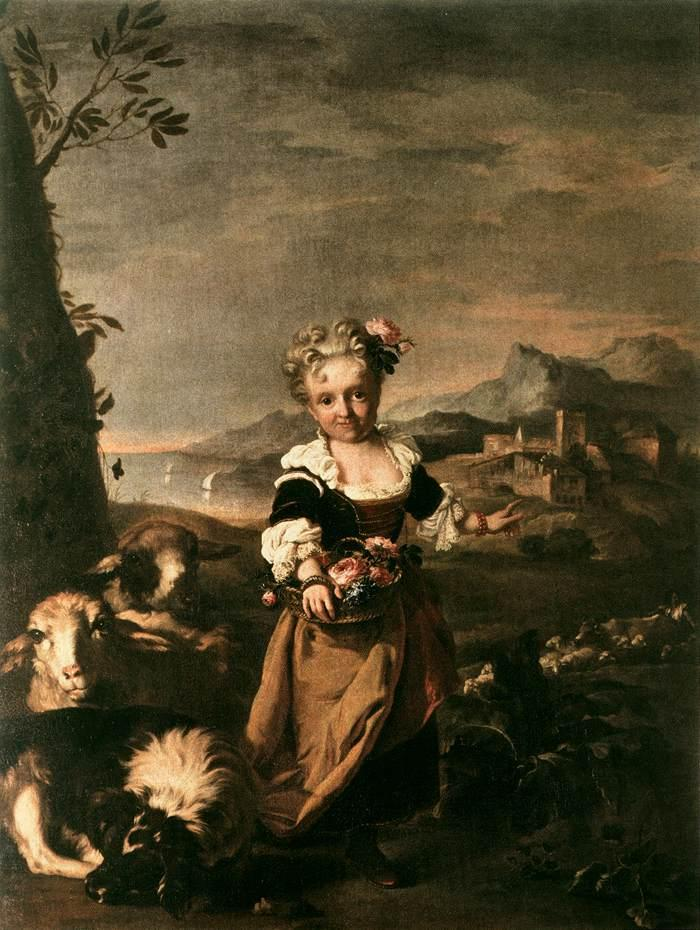
Angiola Biondi, dwarf in the service of Violante Beatrice of Bavaria, 1707.

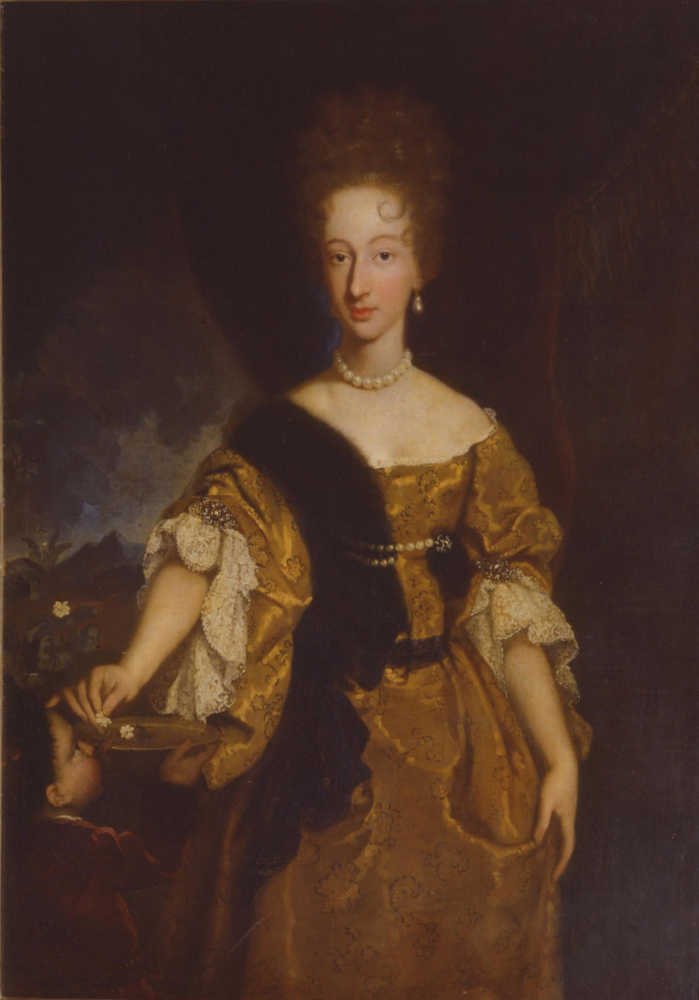
Violante Beatrice of Bavaria.

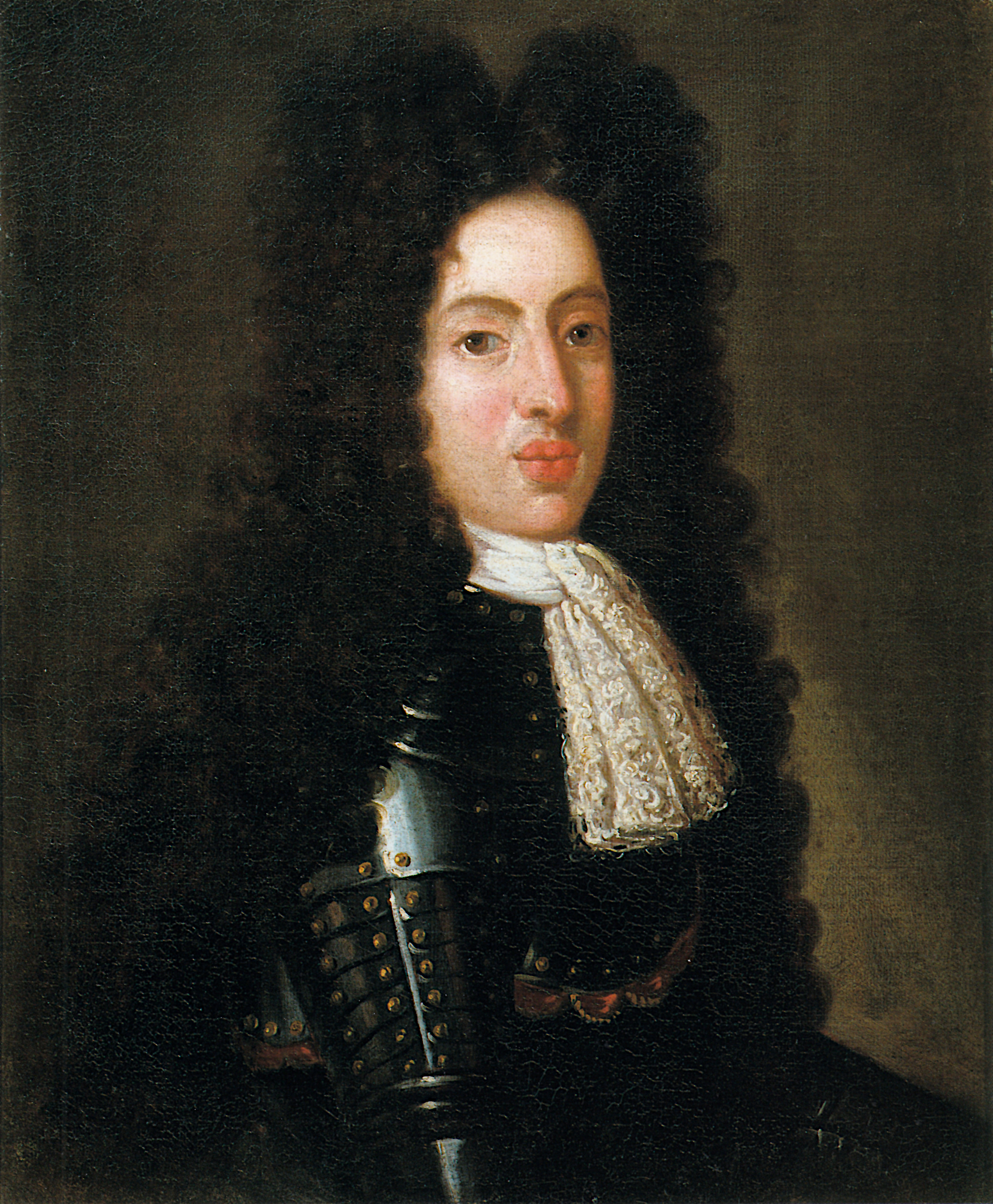
Gian Gastone de' Medici, Grand Duke of Tuscany

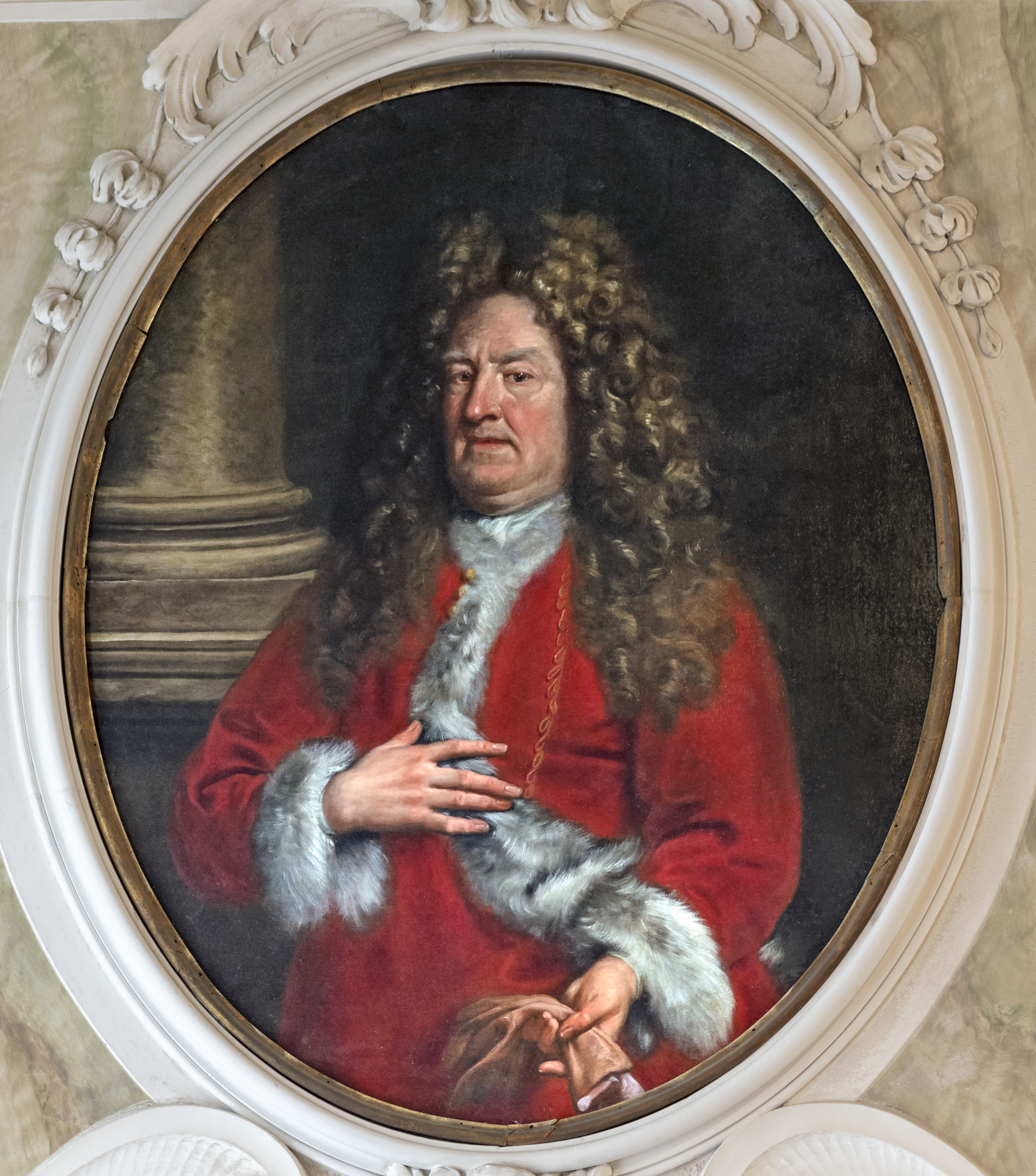
Portrait of a gentleman in red
Ca' Rezzonico Venice
