= Guglielmo Andreoli the Elder =

Italian pianist

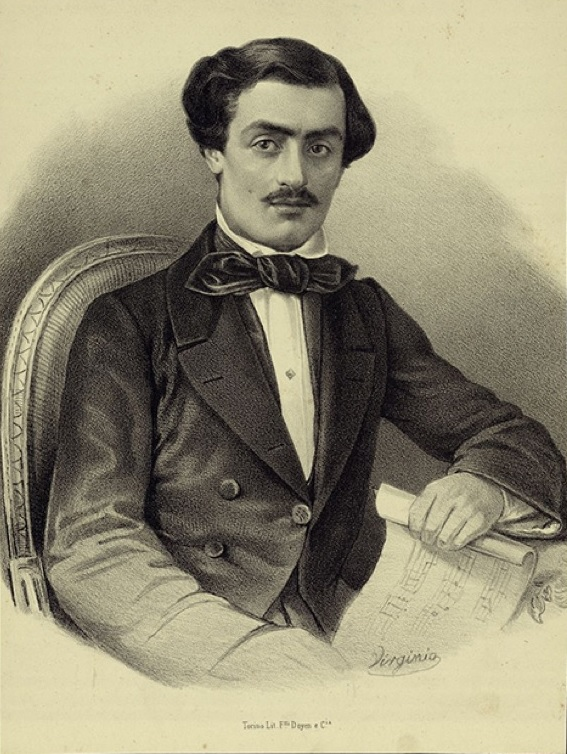
Guglielmo Andreoli the Elder

Guglielmo Andreoli (22 April 1835 – 13 March 1860) was an Italian pianist.

He was born in Mirandola, Modena to the musical family of Evangelista Andreoli; his brothers included Carlo and another Guglielmo (b. 1862), with whom he should not be confused. He was a pupil at the Milan Conservatory from 1847 to 1853, after which he pursued a career as a concert pianist.

He was a pianist of great distinction, remarkable for his soft and delicate touch, pure taste, and power of expression, as well as for great execution. He was well known in London, where he appeared at The Crystal Palace (13 December 1856), the Musical Union (27 April 1858), the New Philharmonic (9 May 1859), among other venues. His health was never strong, and he died at Nice, France in 1860. He also composed, but his compositions are considered unimportant.
