= Carlo Andreoli =

Italian pianist

Carlo Andreoli (8 January 1840 – 22 January 1908) was an Italian pianist.

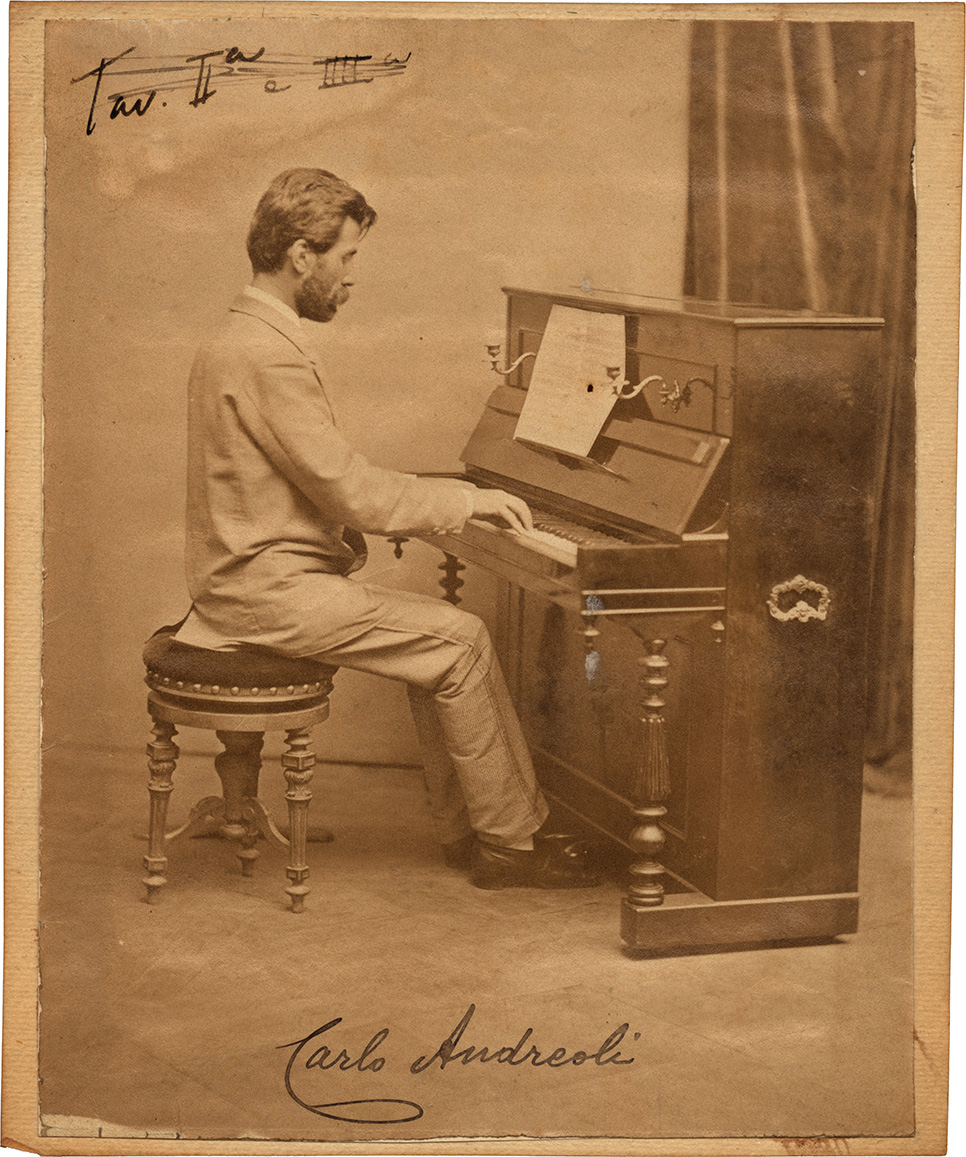
Carlo Andreoli

He was born in Mirandola, Modena to the musical family of Evangelista Andreoli; his brothers included Guglielmo the Elder and the Younger. He was a pupil at the Milan Conservatory. Like his brother Carlo, he was proficient on piano, and gave well-received concerts in London. However, after 1871, his health confined him to Italy and Southern France, and he became professor of the piano at Milan Conservatory. There his students included Alfredo Catalani and Giuseppe Frugatta. From 1877-1887, with the help of his brother Guglielmo the Younger, he organized a series of 96 symphonic concerts known as the Società dei Concerti Sinfonici Popolari. He retired in 1891 due to mental illness. He died in 1908 in a shelter for the mentally ill.

A bust of him was placed in Milan Conservatory in 1910.
