= Giuseppe Andreoli (painter) =

Italian painter

Giuseppe Andreoli (11 January 1720 in San Possidonio, Province of Modena – 3 April 1776 in Mirandola) was an Italian painter.

He studied in Bologna, under Giuseppe Peracini. He painted for the Duomo of Mirandola, a canvas depicting St Possidonio, destroyed during the restorations of 1858. He painted a canvas depicting the Assumption of the Virgin with twelve Apostles donated to the church of San Francesco. He painted the sacristy of the Oratory of the Santissimi Sacramento the Annunciation and two medallions in the Choir.

He painted a San Luigi Gonzaga for the parish church of Tramuschio, a frazione of Mirandola, commissioned by Domenico Paltrinieri. Late in life he developed gangrene and required bilateral leg amputation.

This painter is likely related to Giuseppe Andreoli, also born in San Possidonio, born 1791, and died in Rubiera, October 17, 1822) who was a priest and Italian patriot.

A painter of the same name, born 1932 in Carpi, began painting in 1997.
