= Guglielmo Andreoli the Younger =

Italian composer

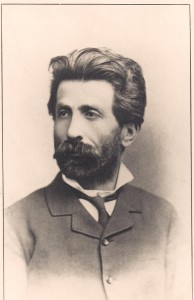
Guglielmo Andreoli (1862-1932)

Guglielmo Andreoli (9 January 1862 - 26 April 1932) was an Italian pianist, music teacher and composer.

He was born in Mirandola, Modena, to the musical family of Evangelista Andreoli (1810-1875). He shared his name with his older brother Guglielmo, who had died nearly two years before his birth. He was also the brother of Carlo Andreoli.

He received his earliest lessons on piano and organ from his father. From 1876 he studied at the Milan Conservatory with Polibio Fumagalli (organ), Giovanni Rampazzini (violin) and Antonio Bazzini (composition). In 1877-1887, he assisted his brother Carlo in organizing a series of 96 symphonic concerts called the Società dei Concerti Sinfonici Popolari. He taught harmony, counterpoint and piano at the Milan Conservatory. His pupils included Victor de Sabata.

Andreoli's compositional legacy includes a symphonic fantasy and two overtures for orchestra, Requiem, string quartet, piano and vocal compositions. Andreoli edited the Italian edition of the works of Beethoven, Mendelssohn, Weber, Ignaz Moscheles, Joachim Raff, and Chopin. He also published a textbook of harmony (1898, in collaboration with Edgardo Codazzi) and oversaw the release of the Italian music pedagogy at the European level of theoretical training.

A music school in his hometown Mirandola is named in honor of the Andreoli brothers.
