= Giovanni Francesco Cassana =

Italian painter (1611–1691)

Giovanni Francesco Cassana (1611–1691) was an Italian painter of the Baroque period, active mainly in Genoa.

== Biography ==
He was a pupil of the painter Bernardo Strozzi. His pupils included his son Niccolò Cassana, Niccolò Bambini, and Giovanni Battista Langetti. He was known chiefly as a portrait artist. He passed some time at the Court of Mirandola, where he painted a St. Jerome in the church of that town.

His younger brother, Giovanni Agostino (died 1720), painted for the Grand duke of Tuscany, but died in Genoa. His sister, Maria Vittoria Cassana, studied under Giovanni Agostino. She died in Venice in 1711. Giovanni Francesco's son, Giovanni Battista, was also a painter.

== See also ==
- Cassana (family)
