= Bellanti Madonna =

Painting by Domenico di Pace Beccafumi

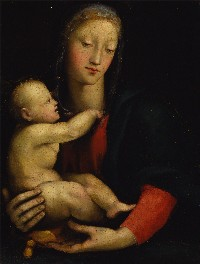
Bellatin Madonna (c. 1515) by Domenico Beccafumi

The Bellanti Madonna is oil-on-canvas painting by the Italian artist Domenico Beccafumi, executed c. 1515. Long attributed to Girolamo del Pacchia, Vigni reattributed it as a youthful work by Domenico Beccafumi in 1936, an attribution accepted by most other later art historians. The painting depicts the Virgin Mary glancing downward, holding the Christ Child in her arms. Jesus is in turn clinging on to Mary's collar. Heavily influenced by Michelangelo (Beccafumi is thought to have travelled to Rome around 1512 and seen the new Sistine Chapel ceiling), its oval format is also influenced by Raphael's Madonnas, as are other Beccafumi works of the period such as the Madonna and Child in his Saint Paul Enthroned. Previously in the Bellanti collection, it is now one of several works by Beccafumi in the Pinacoteca Nazionale in Siena, including another Madonna and Child from 1514.
