= San Niccolò al Carmine, Siena =

Church and monastery in Tuscany, Italy

Coordinates: 43.314199°N 11.327392°E

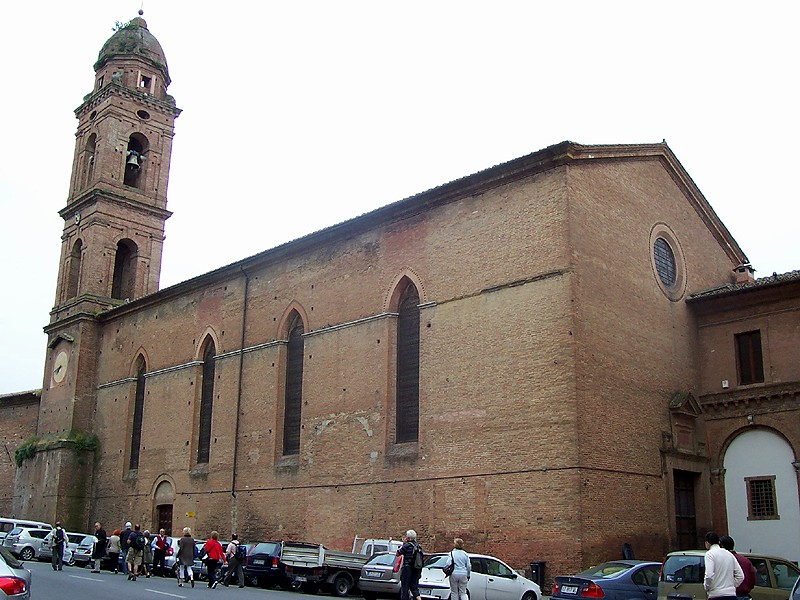
Church of San Niccolò al Carmine.

San Niccolò al Carmine, also called Santa Maria del Carmine is a Renaissance style, Roman Catholic church and monastery located in Pian dei Mantellini #30, near the corner of Via della Diana in the Terzo de Citta of Siena, region of Tuscany, Italy. The church now serves as the Oratory for the Contrada of Pantera. Across the street from the belltower is the Palazzo Celsi Pollini. North along Pian dei Mantellini, toward the Arco delle Due Porte, and on the same side of the street are a number of palaces built around what was once the Monastery of the Derelict Women: in order they are the Neoclassical Palazzo Incontri, the Palazzo Ravissa and the Palazzo Segardi.

== History ==
Tradition holds that some hermits lived at the site in 770; the site then acquired an aedicule with the icon of the Mantellini. A church and convent of the Carmelites developed at the site and was documented since about 1265. At this time, the church was outside the walls of the medieval city, outside the Porta de Due Porte, also called the Gate of Stalloregi and the Arco di Santa Lucia. In the 14th-century, the convent was engrossed by the Walls of Siena. The church and bell-tower as we see it today was designed by Baldassare Peruzzi in 1517; work continued on the church until the 17th century. Later it became a military barrack.

To the sides of the entry is an Anunciation by Dionisio Montorselli. A fresco in the second altar on the right depicts a 14th-century Assumption of the Virgin. An Adoration of the Shepherds on the right was begun by Riccio, and completed by 1571 by Arcangelo Salimbeni, Another painting here is by Stefano Volpi.

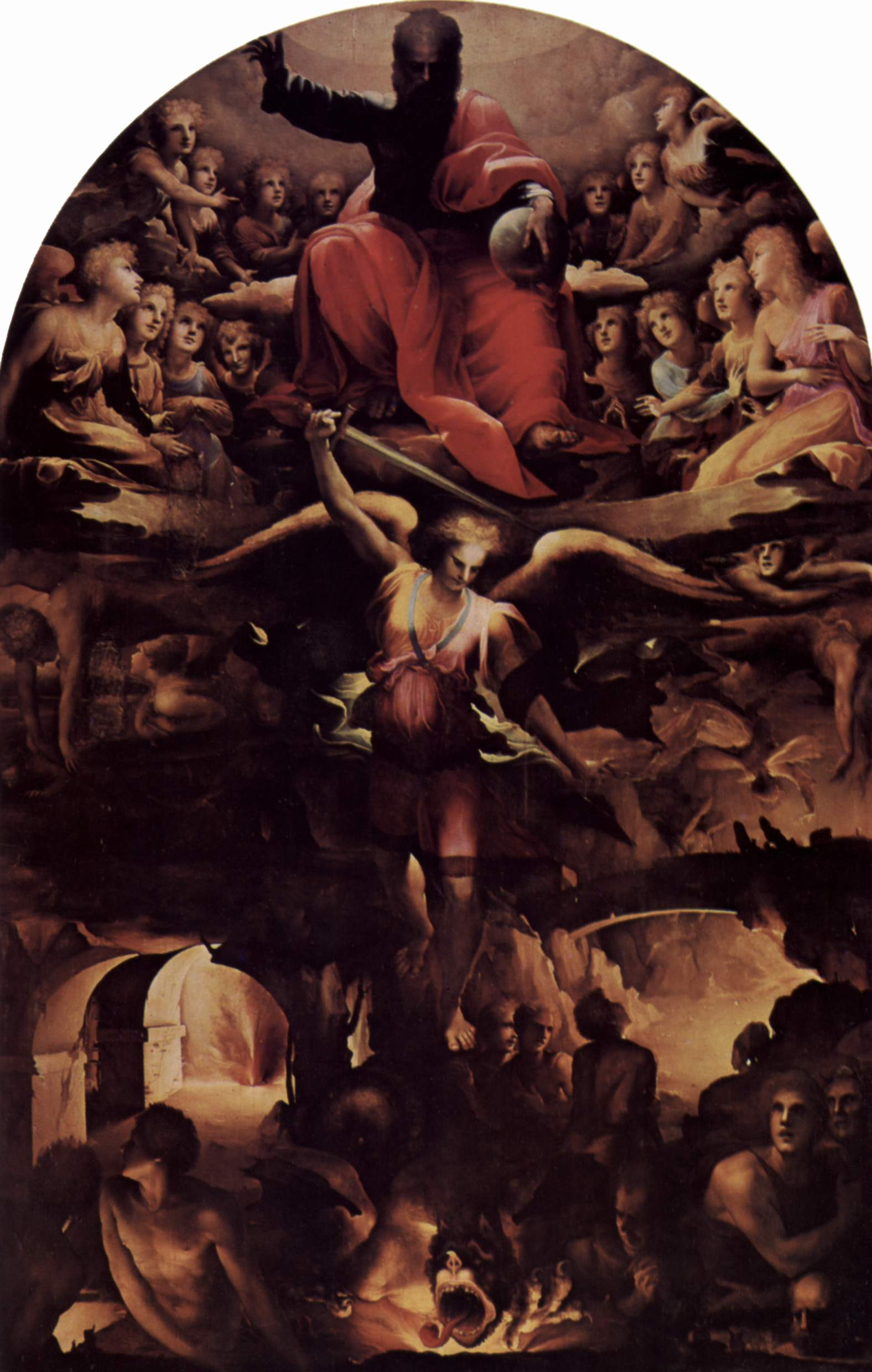
St Michael defeats the Rebel Angels

A canvas depicts the Blessed Franco da Grotti, painted by Rutilio Manetti; St Bartholomew in the Counterfacade altar is a masterwork (1604) by Alessandro Casolani. The Vision of St Teresa of Avila, was painted by Giuseppe Colignon; an Ascent of Christ by Giacomo Pacchiarotti is on a sepulchral monument with relics of the blessed Giovanni Colombini. The St Michael defeats the Rebel Angels is a masterwork by Domenico Beccafumi in the altar near the lateral door.

An altar on the right houses an ancient and revered icon of the Virgin, the Madonna dei Mantellini (circa 1240). The Byzantine style image had popular devotion as the focus for prayers for infants and newborns (who were swaddled in "Mantellini") and this gave name to the area and street. Around the painting are depictions of saints by Francesco Vanni.

The Chapel of the Holiest Sacrament at the right end of the nave, was once kept by the wool-workers. The marble altar was created by Lorenzo di Mariano and it has a Nativity of Mary by Sodoma. The Mannerist painter Girolamo del Pacchia also decorated this chapel in 1512.

Next to the Main Altar is a canvas depicting the Blessed Franco by Rutilio Manetti and a St Teresa of Avila by Stefano Volpi. The main altar with polychrome marble was designed by Tommaso Redi.

The Sacristy (1512) was designed by Vannoccio Biringucci, and has a St Sigismondo in terra cotta by Giacomo Cozzarelli (1515). The cloister was completed in the 16th century and was frescoed by Giuseppe Nasini.
