= Palazzo Incontri =

Palace in Siena, Italy

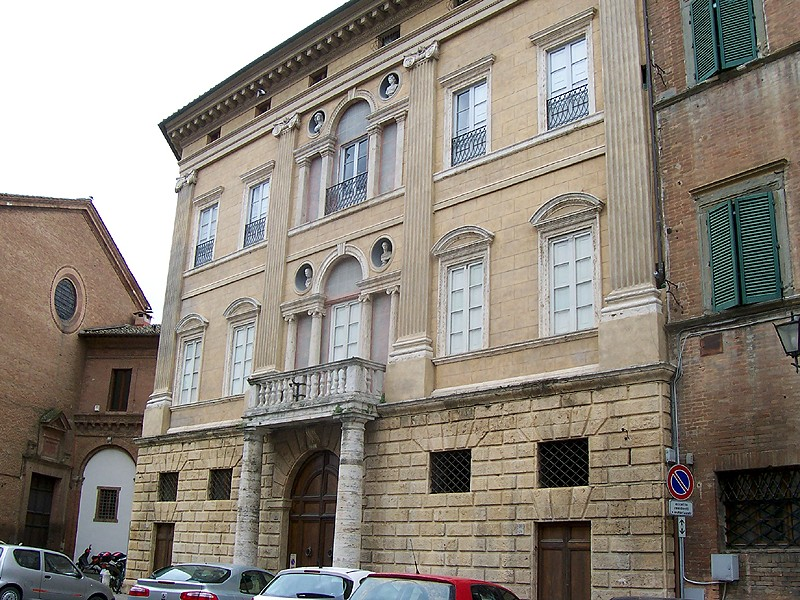
Palazzo Incontri

The Palazzo Piccolomini Bellanti or Palazzo Incontri is a Neoclassical style urban palace locate on Pian dei Mantellini in Terzo di Citta of Siena, region of Tuscany, Italy. The palace rises between the church and convent of San Niccolò al Carmine and what was formerly the Convento delle Derelitti (Convent of the Derelict Women). Across the street is the Palazzo Celsi Pollini, Siena.

The palace has an elegant facade with a giant order of pilasters starting atop a rusticated base with Palladian windows and busts in the niches. The palace was designed in 1799-1804 by Stefano Belli. It is presently a private residence. There is a 17th-century Palazzo Incontri Piccolellis in via dei Servi 3- 5 in Florence.
