= Saint Michael Defeats the Rebel Angels (Beccafumi) =

Painting by Domenico di Pace Beccafumi

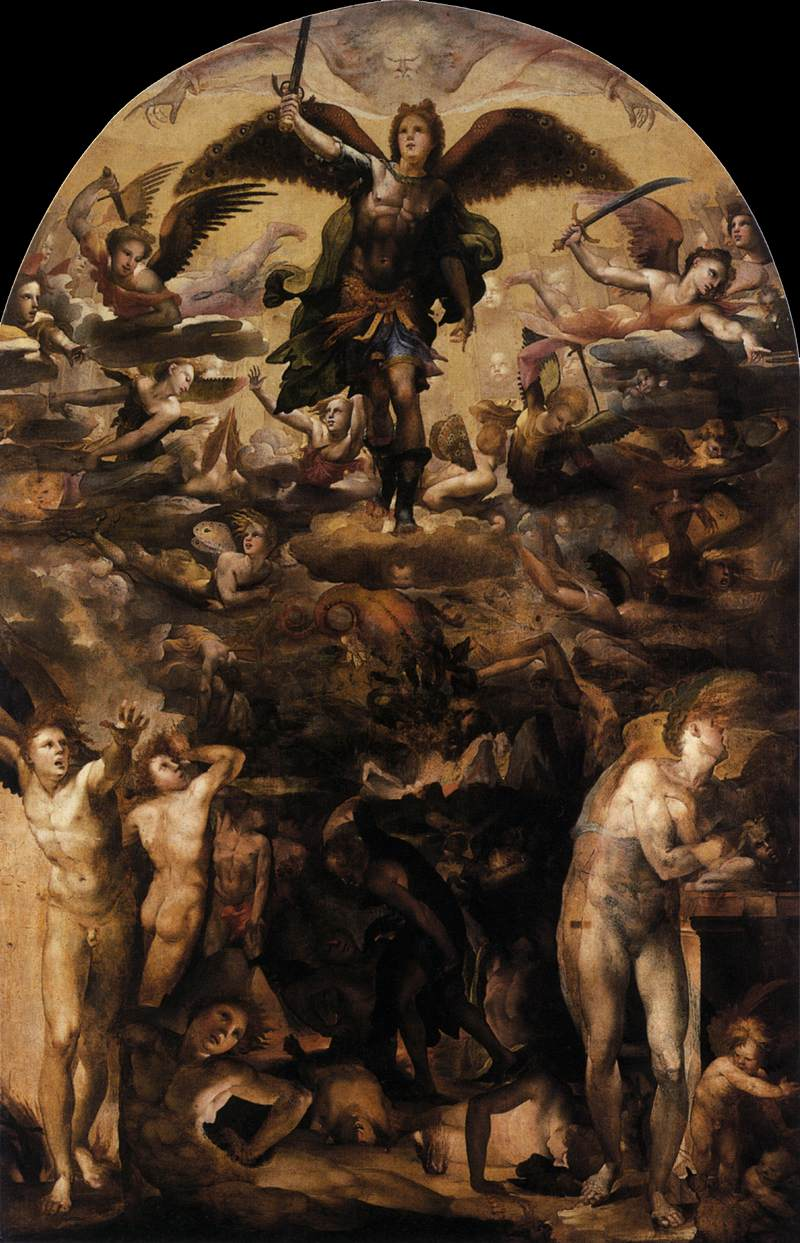
Saint Michael Defeats the Rebel Angels (c. 1524) by Domenico Beccafumi

Saint Michael Defeats the Rebel Angels or Fall of the Rebel Angels is an oil-on-canvas painting by the Italian Renaissance painter Domenico Beccafumi, executed c. 1524, now in the Pinacoteca Nazionale di Siena. It was begun for San Niccolò al Carmine, Siena, but left unfinished, with the artist completing another version for the same church in 1526. Vasari's Lives of the Artists mentions the work, stating the artist wished to create "a new invention to show the virtue and good conceits of his soul".
