= Palazzo Fineschi Segardi =

Italian palace

Coordinates: 43°18′53″N 11°19′38″E

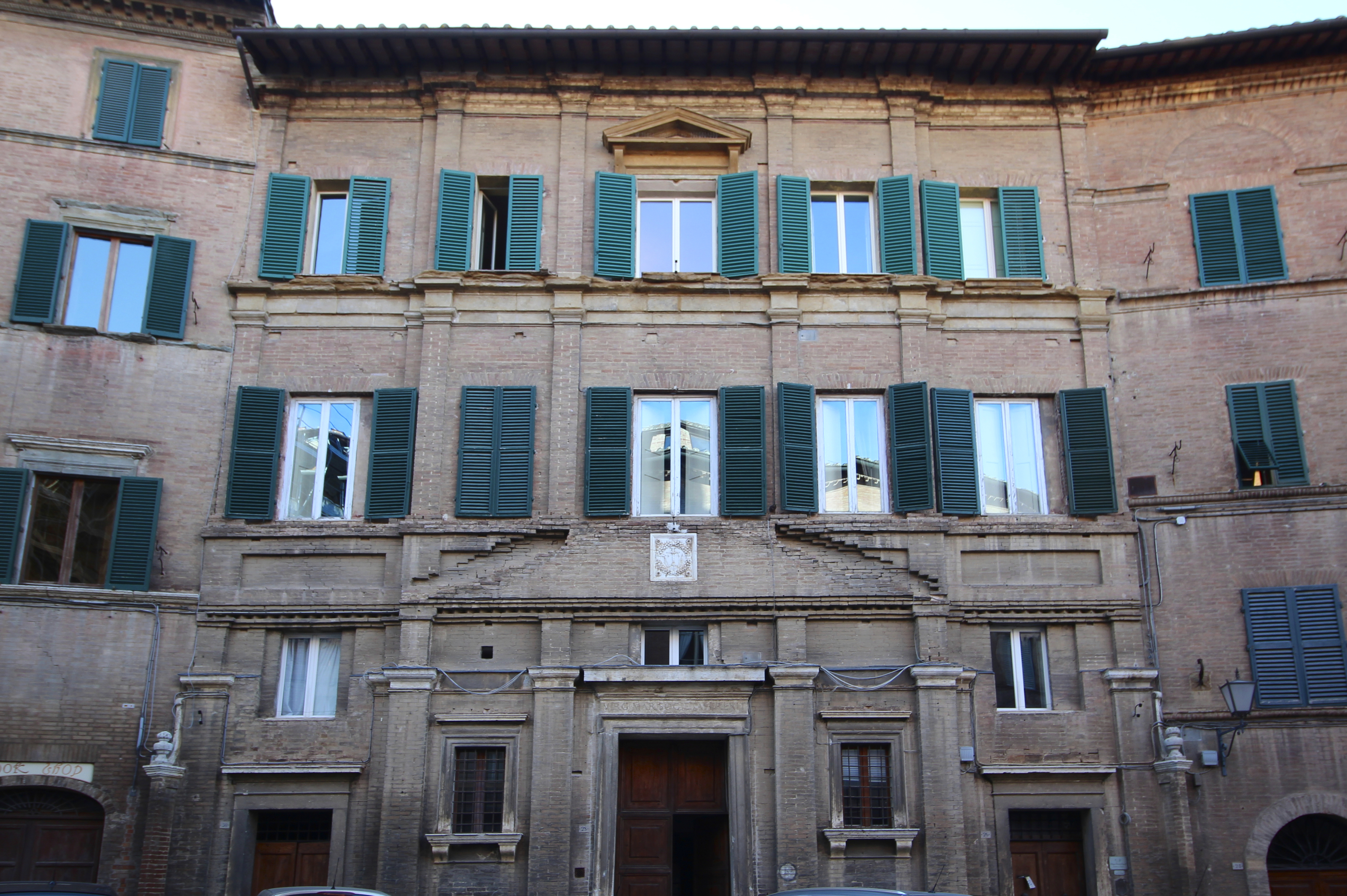
Palazzo Fineschi Segardi, Siena

The Palazzo Fineschi Sergardi is a 16th-century urban palace located the Pian dei Mantellini neighborhood of the city of Siena, region of Tuscany, Italy. It is located near the Palazzo Celsi Pollini.

== History ==
The palace was commissioned in the 16th century from designs by Bartolomeo Neroni. In the following centuries it also became a convent, and was acquired in the 17th century by the Fineschi Sergardi family, who refurbished the structures. Today it serves as a boutique hotel.
