= Stories of Moses and the Evangelists =

Series of paintings by Domenico Beccafumi

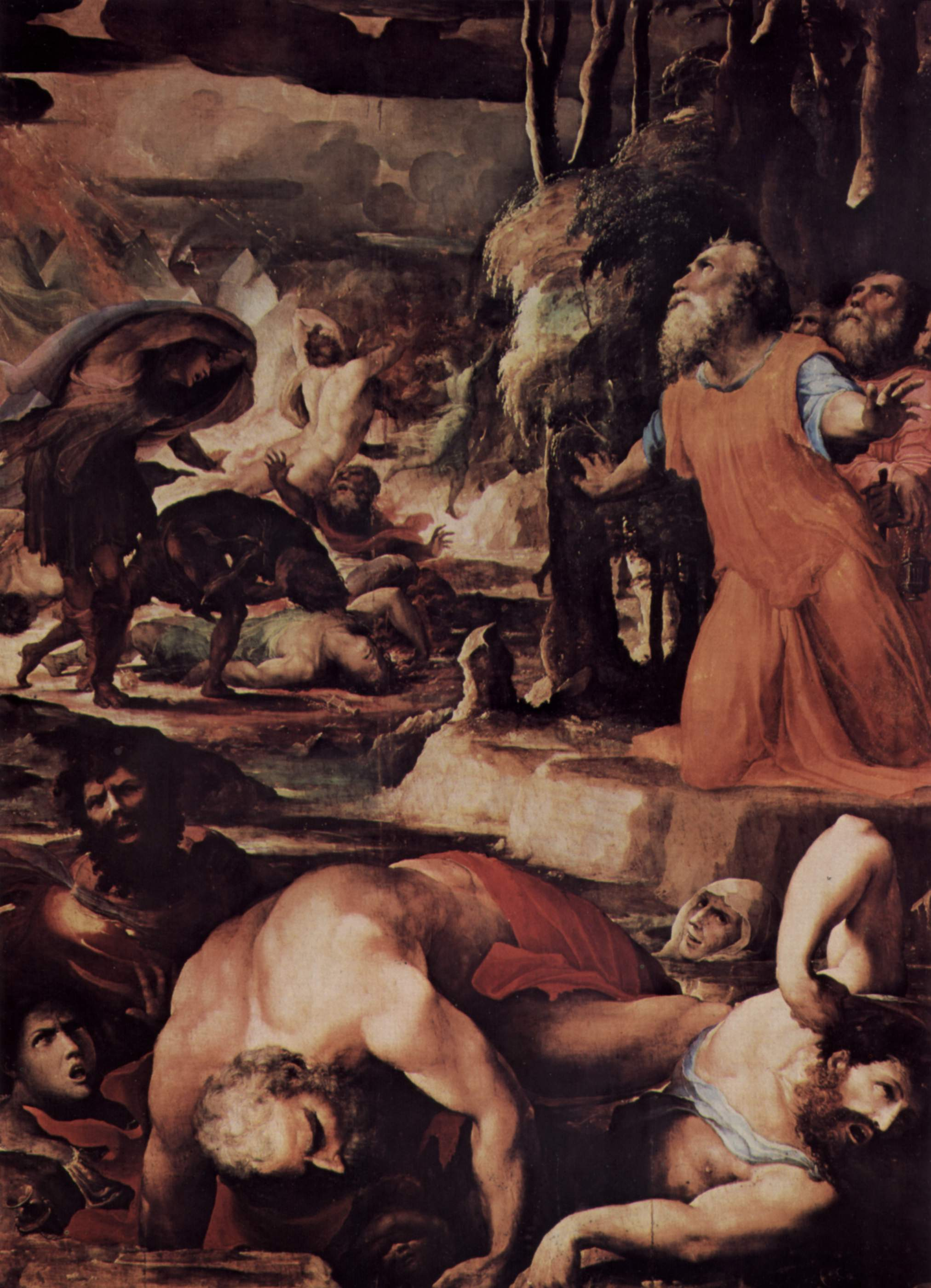
- Fire sent down from heaven on Korach, Datan, and Aviram
- Artist: Domenico Beccafumi
- Year: 1538-1539
- Medium: oil on panel
- Location: Pisa Cathedral

The Stories of Moses and the Evangelists are a series of oil on panel paintings by Domenico Beccafumi, dating to circa 1538-1539 and hanging in Pisa Cathedral. They form part of a decorative scheme of 27 panels, only completed at the end of the 17th century, also including works by Andrea del Sarto and Il Sodoma.

== History ==
Intended for the ceiling of an apse, the two scenes of Moses were commissioned by Antonio Urbani, the Operaio della Primarizale (Vasari mistakenly states they were commissioned by his successor in that office, Sebastiano della Seta). Moses Smashing the Tablets of the Law was paid for on completion on 22 June 1538 and Fire Sent Down from Heaven paid for on completion on 29 February 1539 (1538 according to the Pisan calendar). The artist was paid 350 lira for each work.

Soon afterwards four paintings of the Evangelists were commissioned for the neighbouring niches - Saint John and Saint Luke were completed on 1 July 1539, then Saint Matthew and Saint Mark on 25 December 1539. The artist was paid 200 lira for each of the four paintings.

== List of works ==
| Image | Subject | Date | Measurements | Notes |
|---|---|---|---|---|
| | Moses Smashing the Tablets of the Law | 1538 | 197x139 cm | |
| | Fire sent down from heaven on Korach, Datan, and Aviram | 1539 | 197x139 cm | The screaming bearded man on the left may be a self-portrait of the painter. |
| | Saint John | 1539 | 197x88 cm | |
| | Saint Luke | 1539 | 197x88 cm | |
| | Saint Matthew | 1539 | 197x88 cm | |
| | Saint Mark | 1539 | 197x88 cm | |

== Bibliography ==
- (in Italian) Anna Maria Francini Ciaranfi, Beccafumi, Sadea Editore/Sansoni, Firenze 1967.
