= Tanaquil (painting) =

1519 painting by Domenico Beccafumi

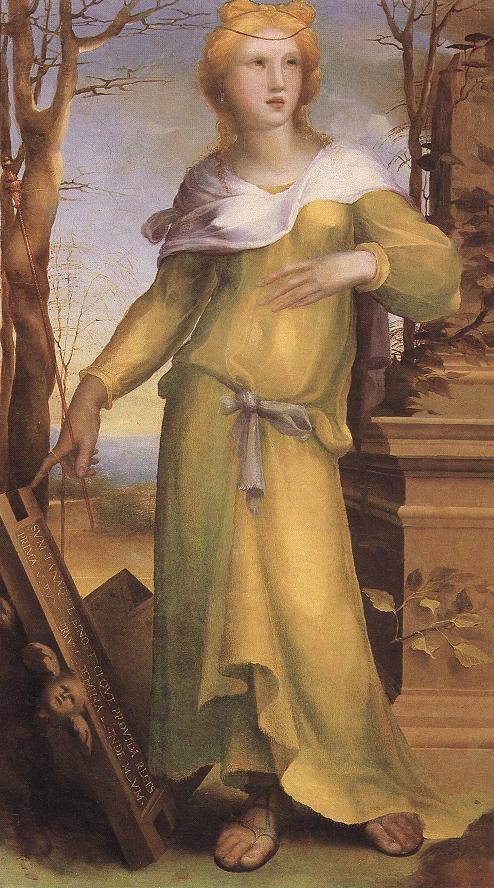
- Artist: Domenico Beccafumi
- Year: c. 1519
- Medium: oil on wood
- Dimensions: 92.1 cm × 53.3 cm (36.3 in × 21.0 in)
- Location: National Gallery of London, London

Tanaquil is an oil-on-wood painting by the Italian Renaissance painter Domenico Beccafumi, which depicts Tanaquil, a queen of Rome. The work was painted by Beccafumi c. 1519 for the bedroom of Francesco Petrucci, Lord of Siena, part of a series which also included Marcia. The painting depicts the queen together with broken architecture and dead plants. She points to a tablet that identifies her as Tanaquil.

== See also ==
- Kingdom of Rome
