= The Story of Papirius =

Painting by Domenico Beccafumi

The Story of Papirius (c. 1525–1530) by Domenico Beccafumi

The Story of Papirius is an oil painting on panel executed c. 1525–1530 by the Italian Renaissance painter Domenico Beccafumi. it is now in the National Gallery, London, to which it was presented by George Salting in 1894.

It shows the boy Papirius brought to the Roman senate by his father, under oath not to reveal the content of the debate. Returning home, he was questioned by his mother (the second scene in the work) and lied to her saying that the senate had discussed allowing men to have two wives and women to have two husbands. She then led Rome's women to the senate the following day to support such a motion, leaving their members confused until Papirius intervened to reveal the background (central scene). The work's Roman setting is suggested by the inclusion of the Colosseum and Castel Sant'Angelo.
