= Marcia (Beccafumi) =

Painting by Domenico Beccafumi

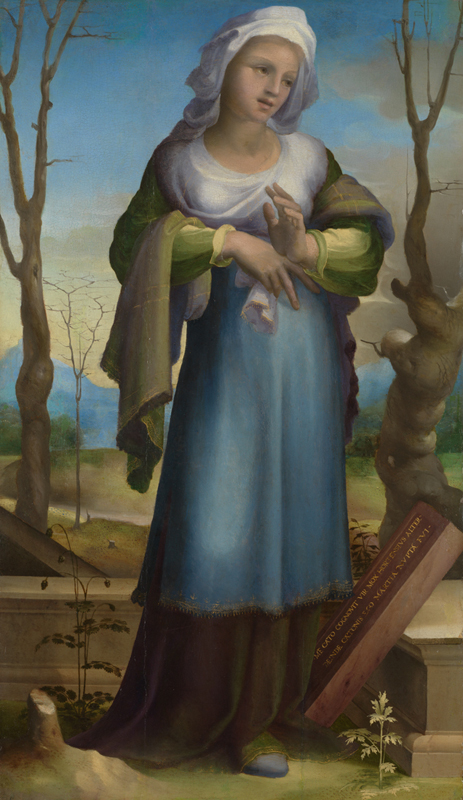
Marcia (c. 1519) by Domenico Beccafumi

Marcia is an oil-on-wood painting executed c. 1519 by the Italian Renaissance painter Domenico Beccafumi. It depicts Marcia, wife of Cato the Younger. The painting's dimensions are 92.1 by 53.3 cm. Marcia and Tanaquil, both in the National Gallery, in London, originally formed part of a series of paintings of noted women from Roman antiquity.
