= Arco delle Due Porte, Siena =

Coordinates: 43.185507°N 11.194002°E

The Arco delle Due Porte or Arch of the Two Doors is one of the remaining portals in the 11th century walls of Siena. It has been variously called the Porta di Stalloreggi with the gates known as San Quirico, Santa Margherita. It was the entrance into the southwestern end of Via Stalloreggi. Outside the gate is a small piazzetta where three streets converge: Via Fosso di Sant'Ansano from the north, Via Paolo Mascagni which descends 200 meters to the later gate Porta Laterina in the 13th-century walls, and Pian dei Mantellini leading south to the church and convent del Carmine.

== History ==
One of the arches has been walled up, likely soon after the 13th-century expansion of the walls.

A tabernacle facing the piazzetta, to the left of the walled-up arch, now shelters behind glass the remains of a Madonna and Child, attributed to either Duccio or one of his followers. The fragment was part of a larger fresco that once included patron saints of Siena. Another Tabernacle stands aside the inner arch of the gate. A plaque on the wall of a house just inside the gate claims Duccio painted his famous Maesta in that house.

== Bibliography ==
- Toscana. Guida d'Italia (Guida rossa), Touring Club Italiano, Milano 2003. ISBN 88-365-2767-1
