= Oratory of the Compagnia di San Bernardino =

Ex oratory and now Museum in Siena, Italy

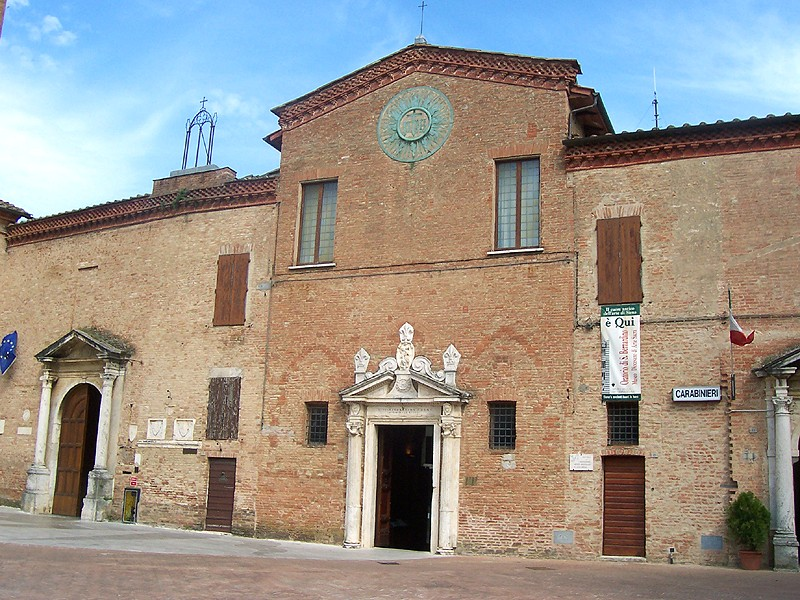
Facade of the oratory

The Oratory of the Compagnia di San Bernardino is an oratory in the Piazza San Francesco in Siena. Elevated to minor basilica status in 1925 by Pope Pius XI, it adjoins rooms housing the diocesan museum. It is notable for its frescoes from various 16th- and 17th-century Sienese painters like Sodoma and Domenico Beccafumi. The oratory is almost adjacent to the Basilica of San Francesco, Siena.

== History ==
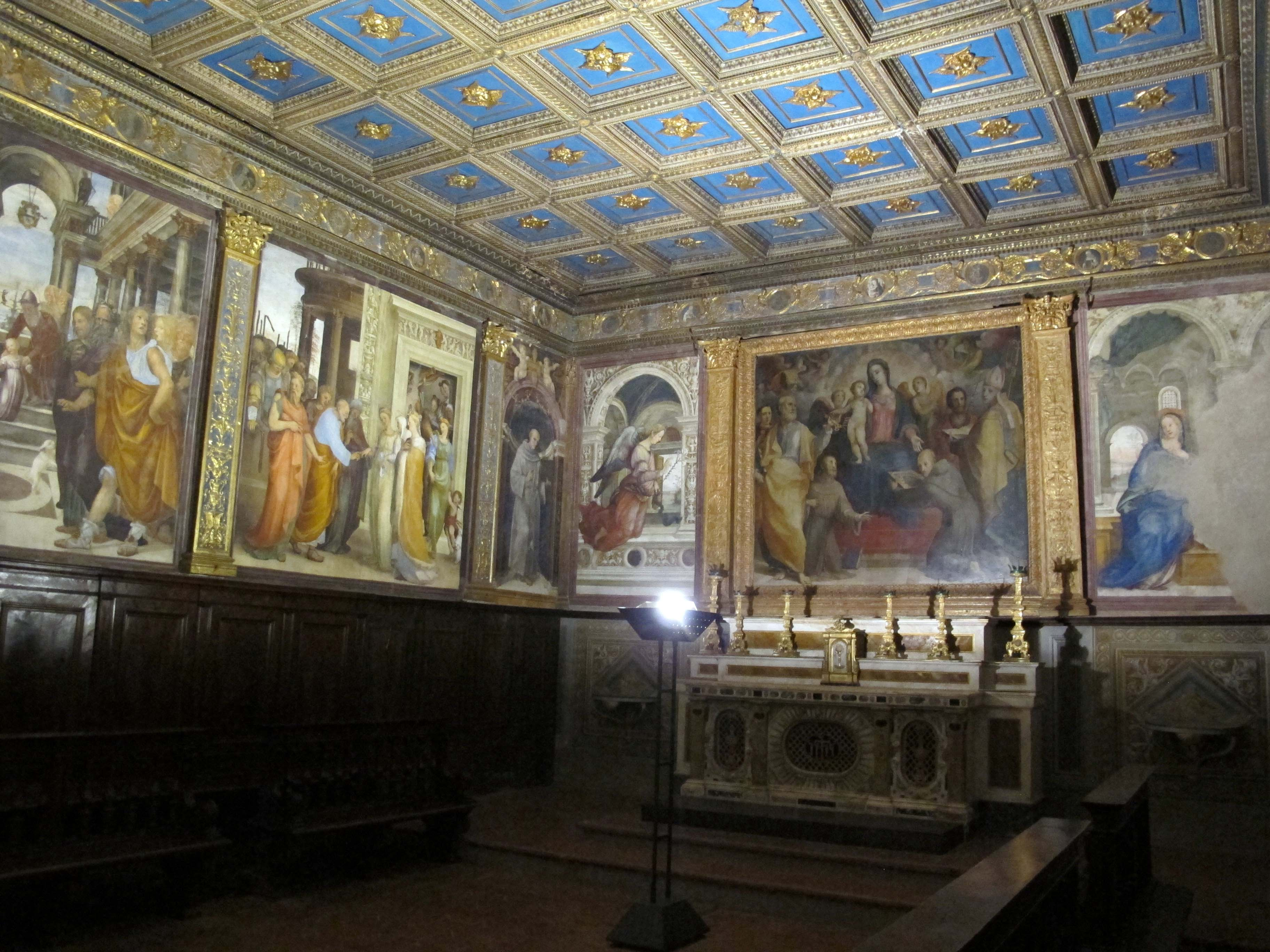
The upper oratory

The confraternity was first recorded in 1273 when it was dedicated to the Virgin Mary and Francis of Assisi. It was rededicated as the Compagnia della Madonna della Veste Nera di San Francesco in the 14th century and then as the Compagnia di San Bernardino in 1450 after Bernardino of Siena's canonisation, around which time it began building an oratory.

== Interiors ==
The upper oratory was decorated in 1496 with engraved wood panelling and ceilings. The wall frescoes were completed a team of painters, and include:

- Il Sodoma:
  - St Ludovico
  - Presentation of Mary at the Temple
  - St Francis of Assisi
  - Visitation of Mary and Anne
  - Coronation of the Virgin
- Domenico Beccafumi
  - Marriage of the Virgin
  - Glory of the Virgin
  - Madona in Glory with Saints
- Girolamo del Pacchia
  - Birth of Mary
  - St Bernardino
  - Archangel Gabriel of the Annunciation
- Sano di Pietro
  - Madonna

There is a marble bas-relief of the Madonna with Angels, by Agostino di Giovanni.

The lower oratory contains 16th century terracotta statues depicting St Bernardino and St Catherine of Siena, as well as Andrea del Brescianino’s Madonna and Child With Saints Ansanus and Bartholomew. The lower oratory has frescoes depicting Life of San Bernardino.

The Diocesan Museum is next door to the oratory.

== Bibliography ==
- Toscana. Guida d'Italia (Guida rossa), Touring Club Italiano, Milano 2003. ISBN 88-365-2767-1
- Anna Maria Francini Ciaranfi, Beccafumi, Sadea Editore/Sansoni, Firenze 1967.
- "Fonte: scheda nei "Luoghi della Fede", Regione Toscana".
- Painting in Late Medieval and Renaissance Siena, 1260–1555, by Diana Norman, page 261.
- The Story of Siena and San Gimignano, by Edmund Garratt Gardner, page 285.
