= Mystic Marriage of Saint Catherine (Beccafumi) =

Painting by Domenico di Pace Beccafumi

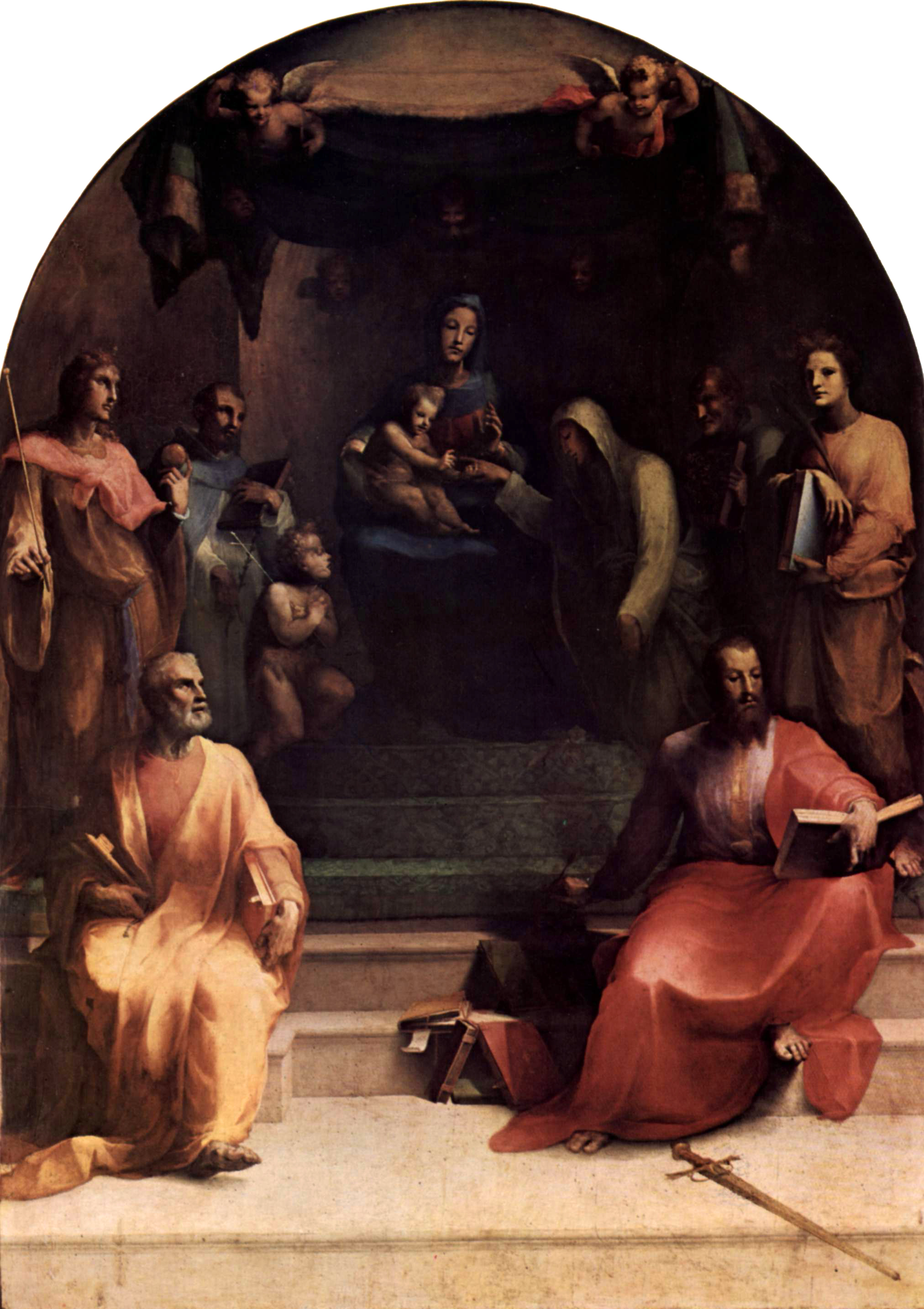
Mystic Marriage of Saint Catherine (c. 1528) by Domenico Beccafumi

Mystic Marriage of Saint Catherine is an oil-on-canvas painting executed c. 1528 by the Italian Renaissance painter Domenico Beccafumi. It is now in the Palazzo Chigi-Saracini in Siena.

== History ==
It is first recorded in 1538–1539 in the Dell'Orafo chapel in the Church of Santo Spirito in Siena. Vasari's Lives of the Artists particularly praised the saints' clothes in the work. Its predella was removed and is now mostly lost, though one panel survives in the Kress collection in the Philbrook Museum of Art and two were in the Scharf Collection in London and are now in the Getty Museum. Two sketches survive in the Gabinetto dei Disegni e delle Stampe of the Uffizi, in Florence.

== Description and style ==
Under a canopy supported by angels, Mary enthroned, at the top of a flight of steps, looks at her infant son who rings Saint Catherine of Siena, kneeling on the right. Some saints are present, arranged in an ordered symmetry, among with Saints Peter and Paul, Saint Sigismund, Saint Dominic, the infant John the Baptist, Bernardino of Siena and Saint Catherine of Alexandria, in the background.

The painting's dimensions are 347 by 225 cm. Its tone is influenced by the Madonna of the Baldacchino of Raphael and the works of Fra Bartolomeo. What belongs to Beccafumi is the particular luminous and chromatic orchestration, made of an alternation between areas of deep shadow and illuminated ones, as well as soft and iridescent colors.
