= Sarteano Annunciation =

Painting by Domenico Beccafumi

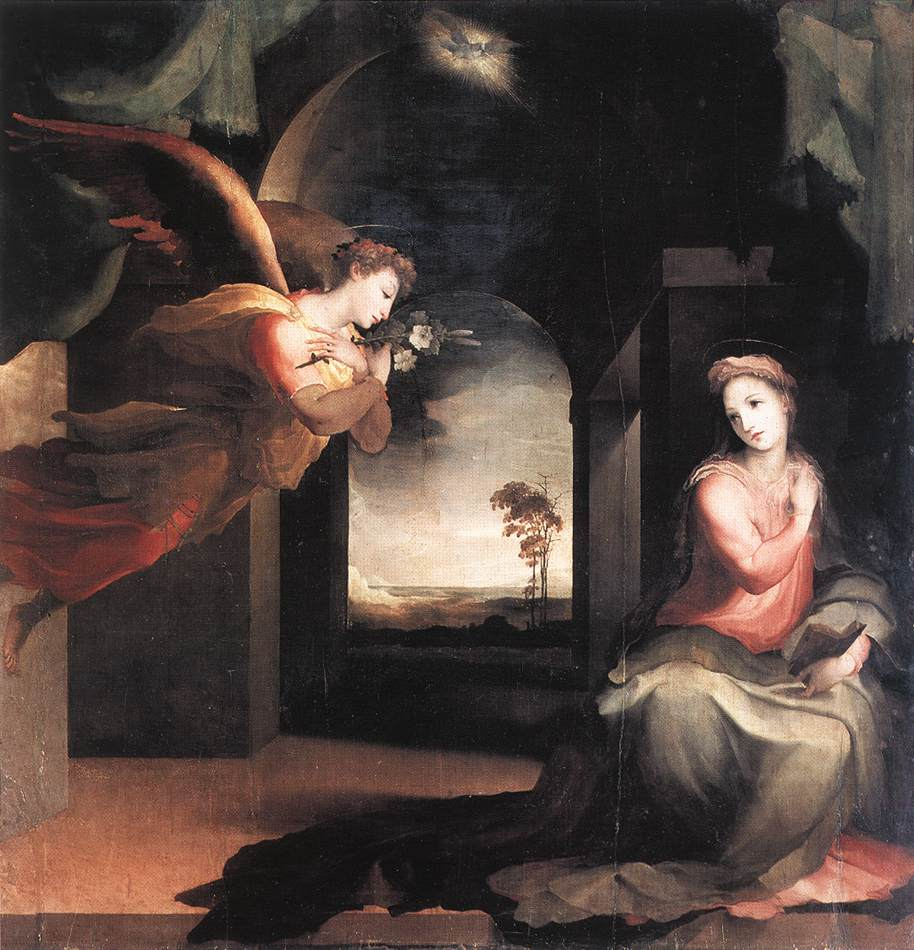
Sarteano Annunciation (c. 1546) by Domenico Beccafumi

The Sarteano Annunciation is an oil-on-canvas painting by the Italian Renaissance painter Domenico Beccafumi, executed c. 1546. It is located in the church of San Martino in Foro in Sarteano, Italy.

The painting depicts the Annunciation, an event in Christian theology. The angel Gabriel visits the Virgin Mary to tell her that she will be the mother of Jesus Christ.

As one of the painter's last works, it is recorded in a 1548 document as being produced for a man named Gabriello di Sarteano. The document also mentioned that it had been commissioned around 1545 and that it had "more figures", possibly on a now-lost predella. Two years after the commission the painter complained to the governors of Siena that he had still not been paid for the work.
