= Saint Catherine of Siena Receiving the Stigmata =

Painting by Domenico Beccafumi

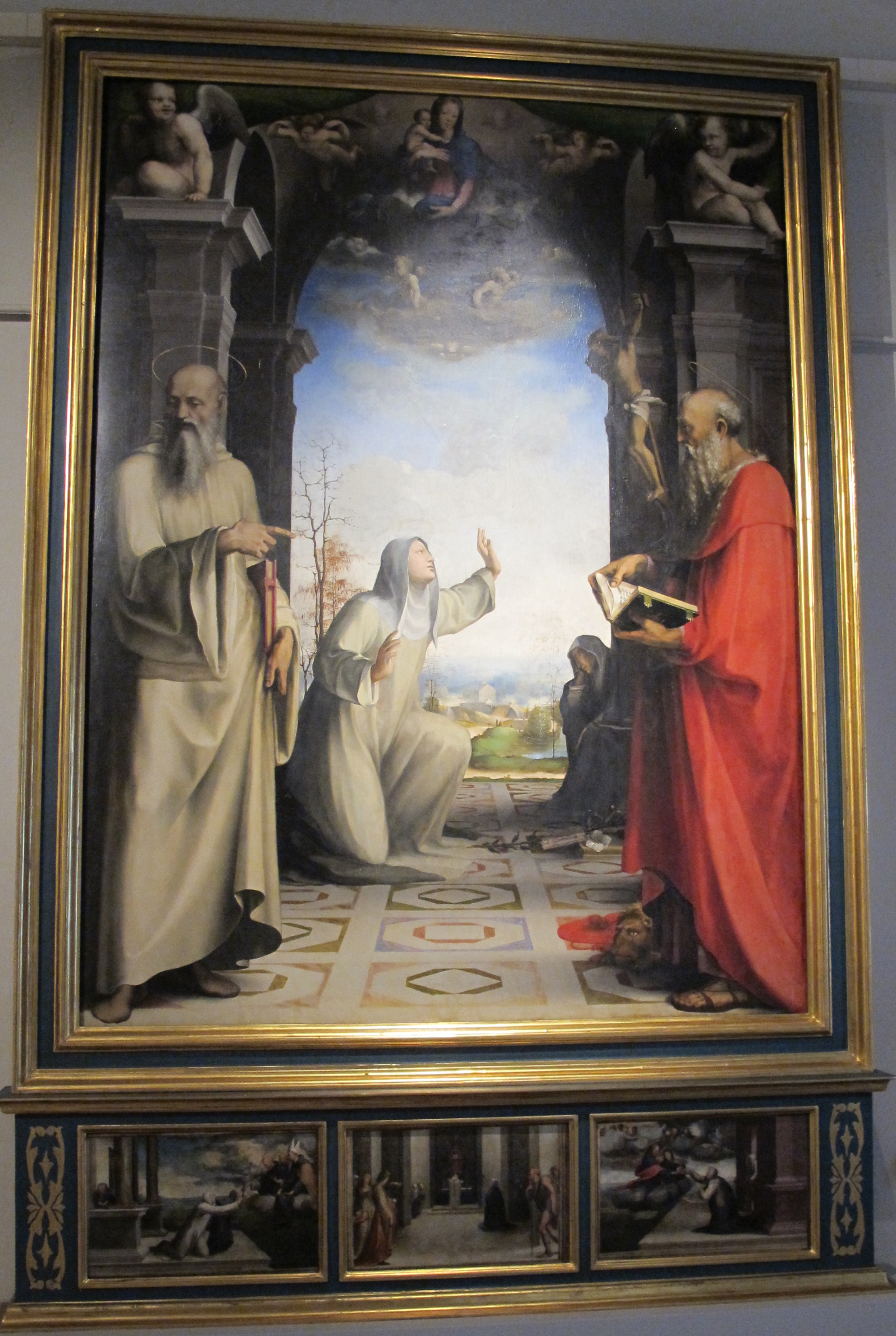
Saint Catherine of Siena Receiving the Stigmata (c. 1515) by Domenico Beccafumi

Saint Catherine of Siena Receiving the Stigmata is an oil-on-canvas painting by the Italian Renaissance painter Domenico Beccafumi, executed c. 1515, now in the Pinacoteca Nazionale di Siena.

The painting depicts Catherine of Siena kneeling in front of a crucifix, as she receives the stigmata. The Virgin Mary carrying the Christ Child appears above her.

The first masterpiece of the artist's maturity, it was originally in the now-destroyed Olivetan monastery outside the Porta Tufi. It is dated on stylistic grounds. The predella was removed around the time of Della Valle before being recovered in the Padre Generale's apartments. The whole work was restored by the Florentine Gagliardi in 1830.
