= Self-Portrait (Beccafumi) =

Painting by Domenico di Pace Beccafumi

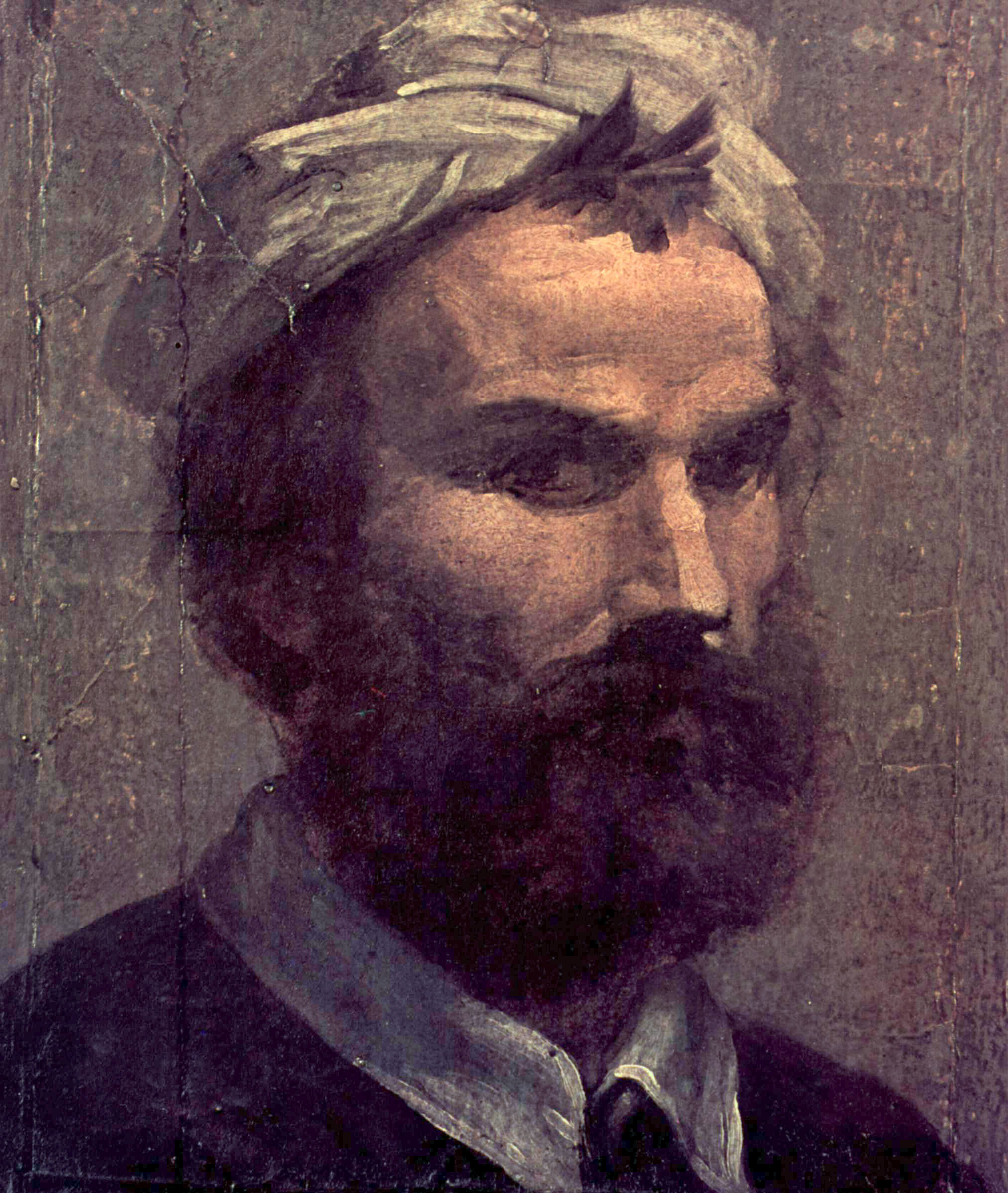
Self-Portrait (c. 1525–1530) by Domenico Beccafumi. The original section of the work without the later expansion.

Self-Portrait is a c. 1525–1530 oil painting by Domenico Beccafumi, using a support of card pasted onto canvas. It forms part of the collection of artist's self-portraits at the Uffizi in Florence, Italy. It entered the gallery in 1682 by which time it had been expanded on all four sides to fit a frame or to make it a pendent to another work.

Its frame misidentifies it as a self-portrait by Passeri, it regained its present attribution in the second half of the 20th century after previous critical neglect. However, no other portrayals of the painter survive for comparison and so it may be a sketch for a portrait of another man rather than a self-portrait.
