= Bartolomeo Neroni =

Italian painter

Bartolomeo Neroni, also known as Il Riccio or Riccio Sanese (c.1505–1571) was an Italian painter, sculptor, architect and engineer of the Sienese School. He was born and died in Siena.

== Biography ==
Neroni was influenced by Domenico Beccafumi and Baldassare Peruzzi. He is described as a pupil of Il Sodoma, and he married this painter's daughter.

Neroni was a versatile artist who created in the course of his life numerous works in various fields, painting, sculpture, and manuscript illumination. He also enjoyed great fame in life as a military engineer and architect. He is mentioned as Riccio Sanese, a pupil of Sodoma, by Vasari in his Vite

Most of his works were either ephemeral or have been lost. He created the scenography for the comedy of l'Ortensio, presented for the Grand Duke Cosimo I, in the Salone delle Commedie of Florence. The work was engraved by Andrea Andreani of Mantua in 1579. His major work is the Mannerist Coronation of the Virgin at the Pinacoteca Nazionale di Siena.

Among his other works are:

- Frescoes for the Casa Guglielmi, Siena (1537)
- Frescoes for the Abbey of Monte Oliveto Maggiore
- Design of the Palazzo Fineschi Segardi, Siena (later a Monastery delle Derelitte)
- Painting of Nativity, Church of the Carmine, Siena
- Painting of Risen Christ, Chigi-Saracini Collection, Siena.
- Teatro Comunale dei Rinnuovati (1560) in the ex-Sala del Consiglio della Repubblica nel *Palazzo Pubblico of Siena (destroyed by fire).
- Access staircase (1570) to Nicola Pisani's Pulpit in the Cathedral of Siena.
