= Saint Paul Enthroned =

Painting by Domenico Beccafumi

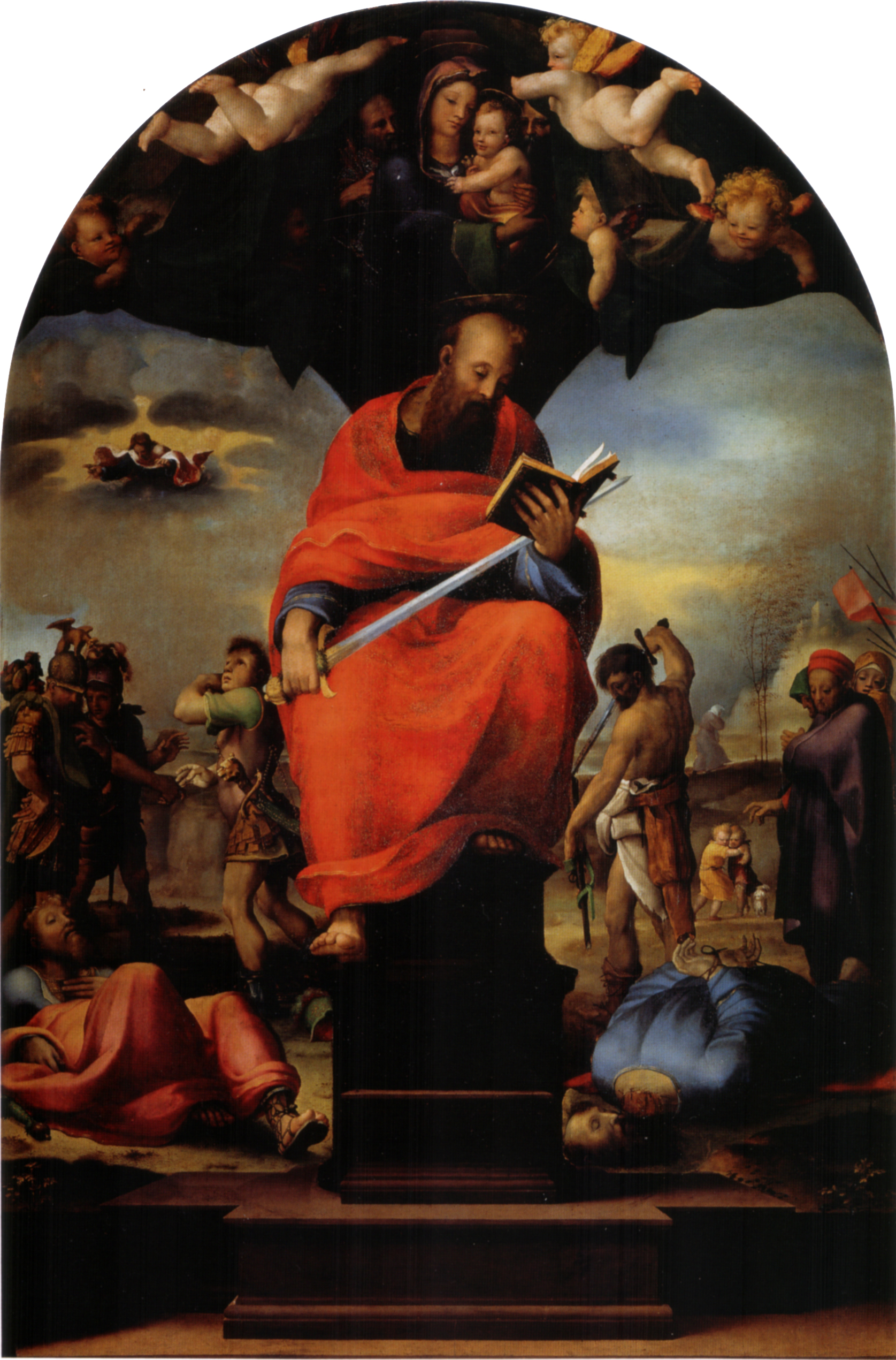
Saint Paul Enthroned (c. 1515) by Domenico Beccafumi

Saint Paul Enthroned is an oil-on-canvas painting by the Italian Renaissance painter Domenico Beccafumi, now in the Museo dell'Opera del Duomo in Siena. On the basis of its style it is dated to c. 1515, before his St Catherine of Siena Receiving the Stigmata and after his trip to Rome, where he had come into contact with Sodoma and Florentine artists of the period. The figure of Saint Paul draws on the prophets in Michelangelo's Sistine Chapel ceiling whilst those in the background draw on Dürer and Piero di Cosimo.

It was commissioned by the Corte degli Uffiziali di Mercanzia for the now-destroyed church of San Paolo in Siena. It was mentioned as a "tavoletta" (small canvas) "made by Domenico when he was young" in Vasari's Lives of the Artists, though that author may not have seen the work himself and no document survives with direct references to the commission. A preparatory drawing for the figures of the Madonna and Child at the top survives in the Uffizi's Gabinetto dei Disegni e delle Stampe (1527 F). Either side of the saint are scenes of his conversion on the road to Damascus and his martyrdom.
