= Domenico Beccafumi =

Italian painter (1486–1551)

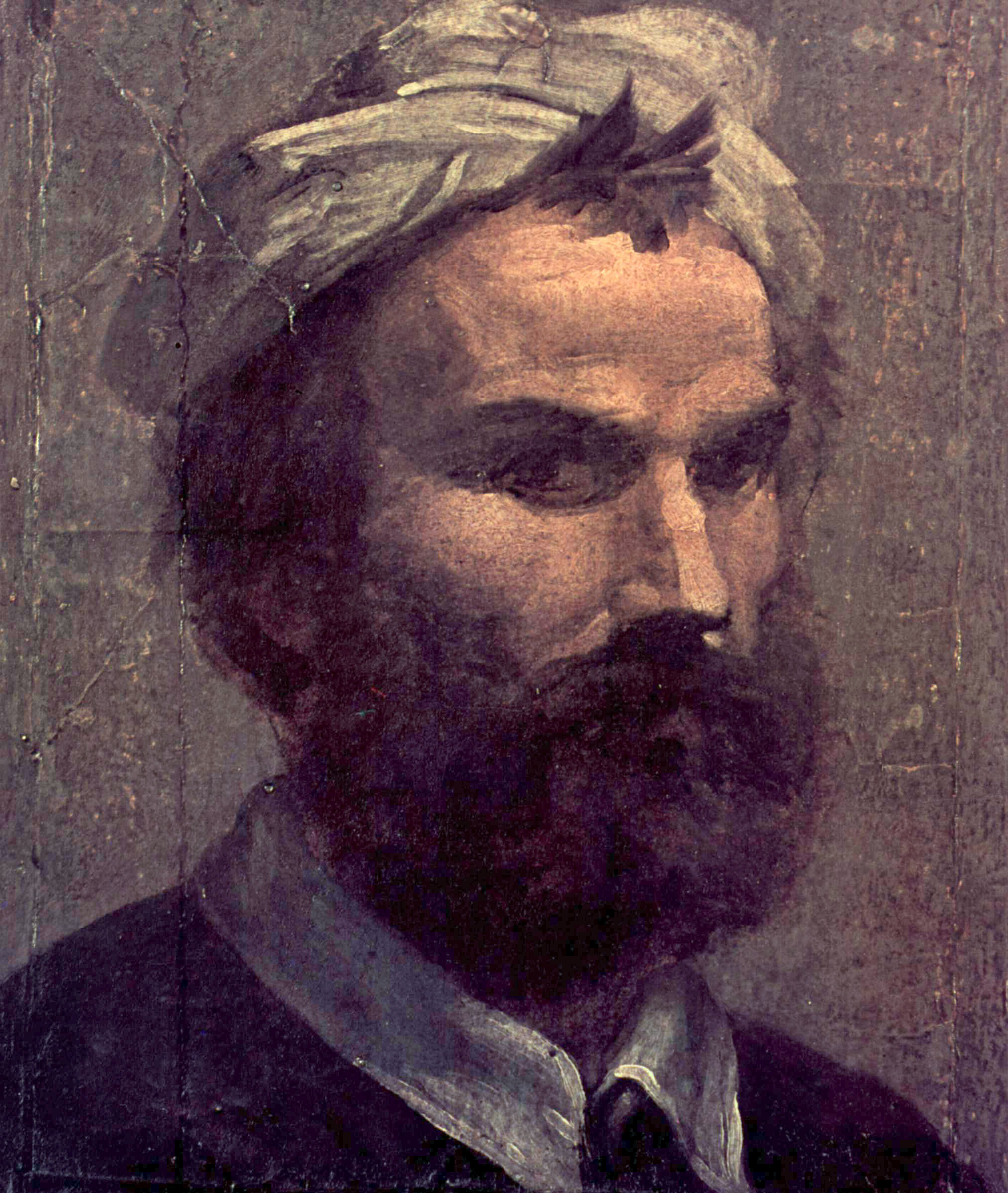
- Self-portrait, c. 1525–1530
- Born: Domenico di Pace Beccafumi; 1486; Montaperti, Republic of Siena
- Died: May 18, 1551 (aged 64–65); Siena, Republic of Siena
- Known for: Painter
- Movement: Mannerism

Domenico di Pace Beccafumi (1486 – May 18, 1551) was an Italian Renaissance-Mannerist painter active predominantly in Siena. He is considered one of the last undiluted representatives of the Sienese school of painting.

== Biography ==
Domenico was born in Montaperti, near Siena, the son of Giacomo di Pace, a peasant who worked on the estate of Lorenzo Beccafumi. Seeing his talent for drawing, Lorenzo adopted him, and commended him to learn ofpaint rom Mechero, a lesser Sienese artist. In 1509 he travelled to Rome, where he learned from the artists who had just done their first work in the Vatican, but soon returned to Siena. However, while the Roman forays of two Sienese artists of roughly his generation (Il Sodoma and Peruzzi) had imbued them with elements of the Umbrian-Florentine Classical style, Beccafumi's style remains, in striking ways, provincial. In Siena, he painted religious pieces for churches and mythological decorations for private patrons, only mildly influenced by the gestured Mannerist trends dominating the neighbouring Florentine school. There are medieval eccentricities, sometimes phantasmagoric, superfluous emotional detail and a misty non-linear, often jagged quality to his drawings, with primal tonality to his colouration that separates him from the classic Roman masters.

== Pavement of Duomo di Siena ==
In addition to painting, he also directed the celebrated pavement of the cathedral of Siena from 1517 to 1544, a task that took over a century and a half. The pavement shows vast designs in commesso work—white marble, that is, engraved with the outlines of the subject in black, and having borders inlaid with rich patterns in many colours. From the year Beccafumi was engaged in continuing this pavement, he made very ingenious improvements in the technical processes employed and laid down scenes from the stories of Ahab and Elijah, of Melchisedec, of Abraham and of Moses. He made a triumphal arch and an immense mechanical horse for the procession of the emperor Charles V on his entry into Siena.

== Critical assessment and legacy ==
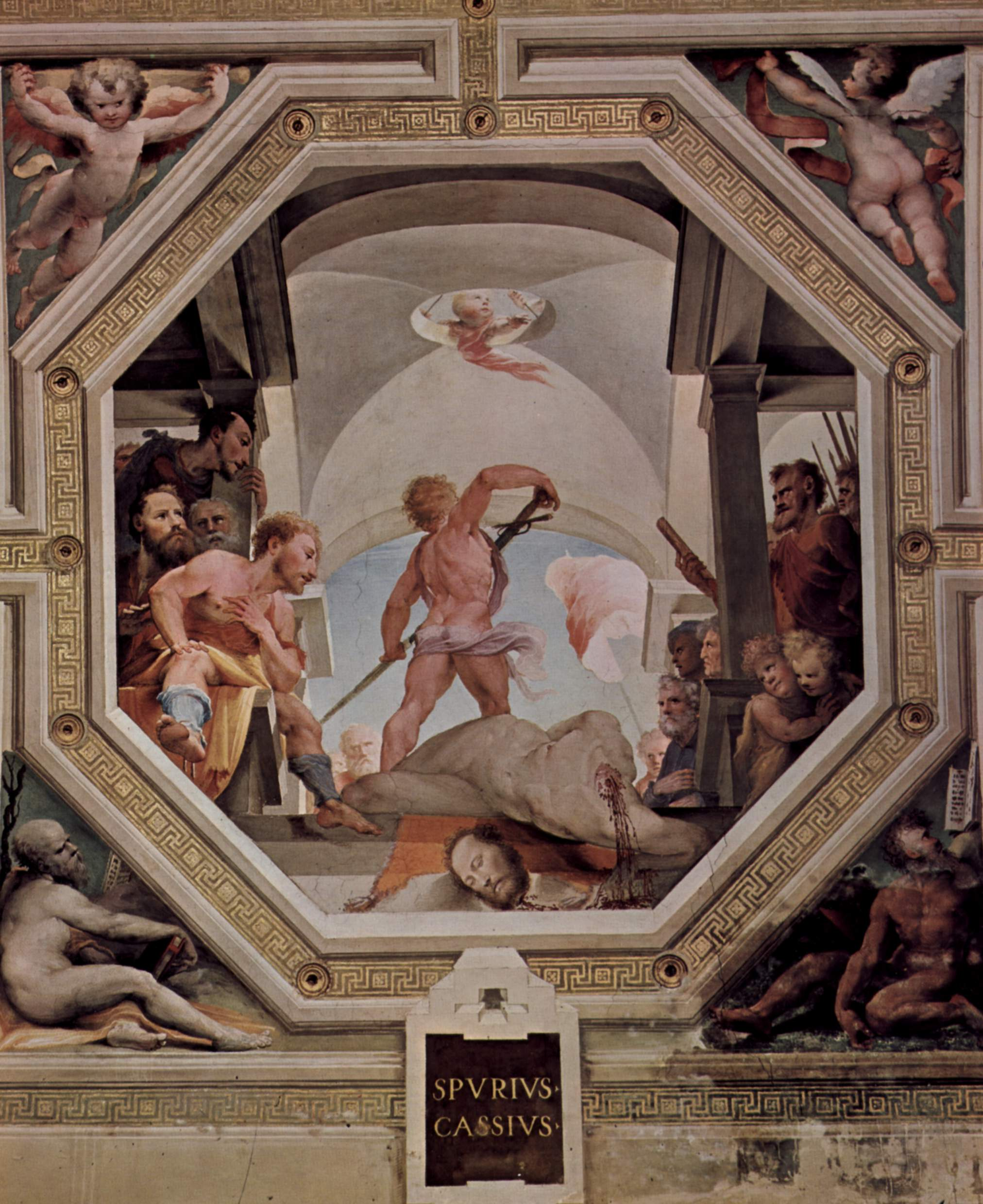
The beheading of Spurius Cassius Vecellinus, fresco (1532–1535), Palazzo Pubblico, Siena

Compared to the equilibrated, geometric, and self-assured Florentine style, the Sienese style of painting edges into a more irrational and emotionally unbalanced world. Buildings are often transected, and perspectives are awkward. The setting is often hallucinogenic; the colours are discordant. For example, in the Nativity (Church of San Martino) hovering angels form an architectural hoop, and figures enter from the shadows of a ruined arch. In his Annunciation, the Virgin resides in a world neither in day nor dusk, she and the Angel Gabriel shine while the house is in shadows. In Christ in Limbo (Pinacoteca Nazionale, Siena), an atypically represented topic, Christ sways in contrapposto as he enters a netherworld of ruins and souls. S. J. Freedberg compares his vibrant eccentric figures to those of the Florentine mannerist contemporary Rosso Fiorentino, yet more "optical and fluid". While all the elements of the expected religious scenes are here, it is like a play in which all the actors have taken atypical costumes, and forgotten some of their lines.

In medieval Italy, Siena had been an artistic, economic, and political rival of Florence; but wars and natural disasters caused a decline by the 15th century. Stylistically, Beccafumi is among the last in a line of Sienese artists, a medieval believer of miracles awaking in Renaissance reality.

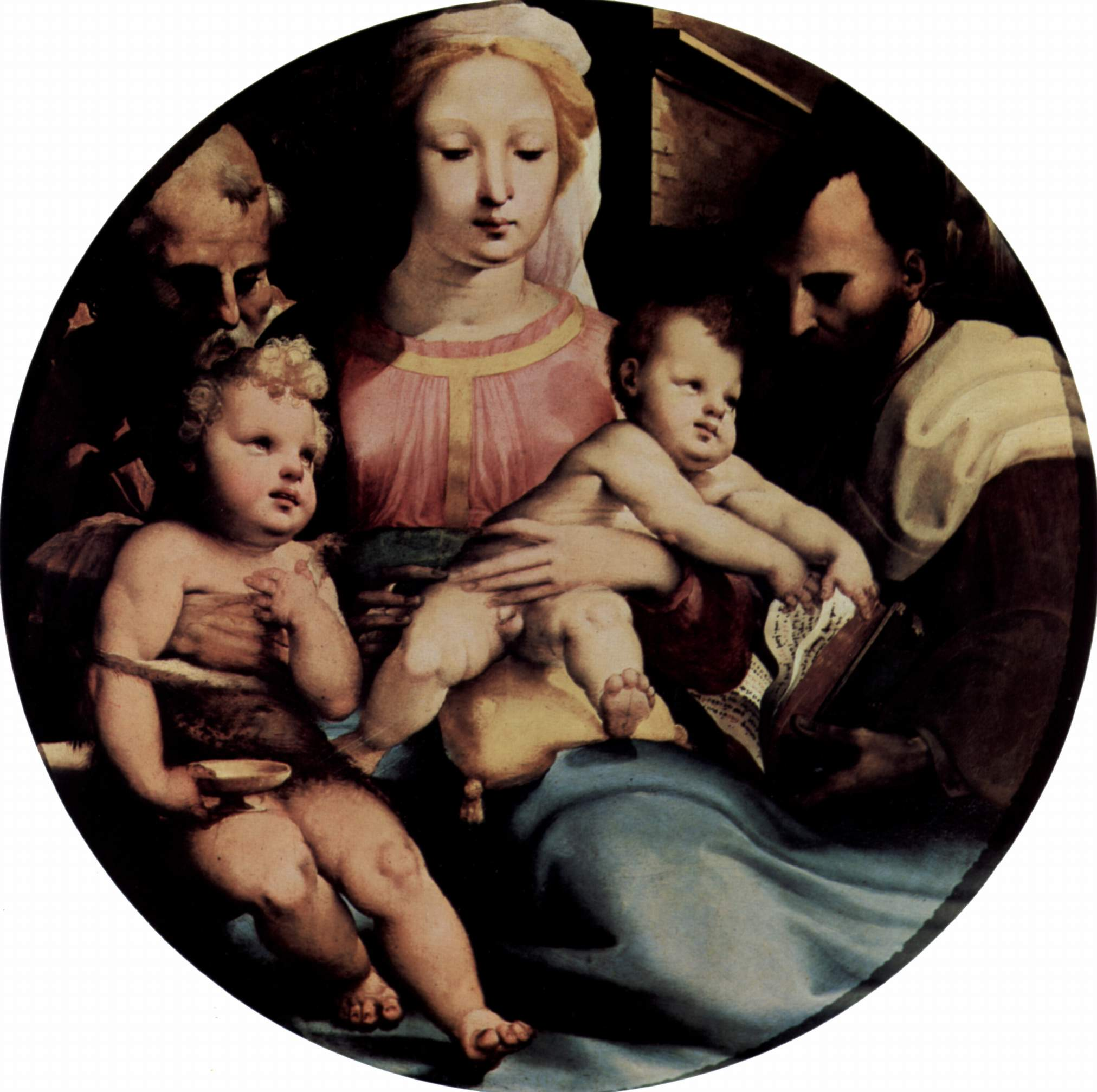
Holy Family with St. John

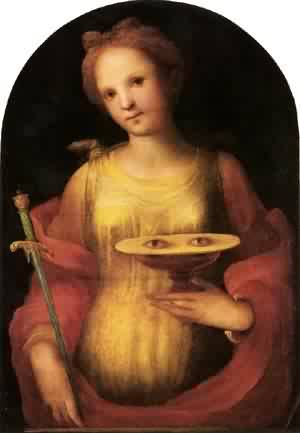
St Lucy, 1521.

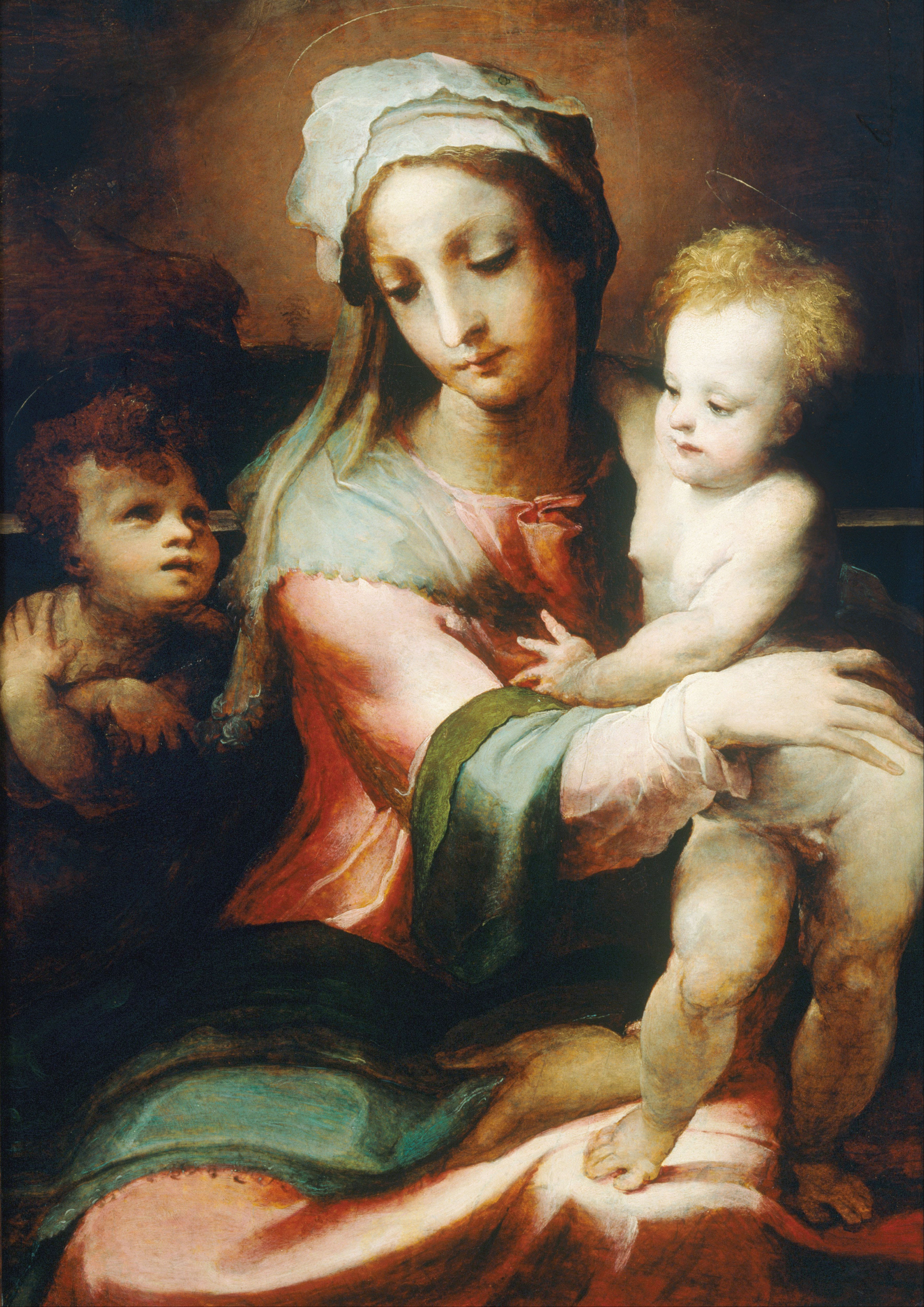
Madonna and child with infant John the Baptist

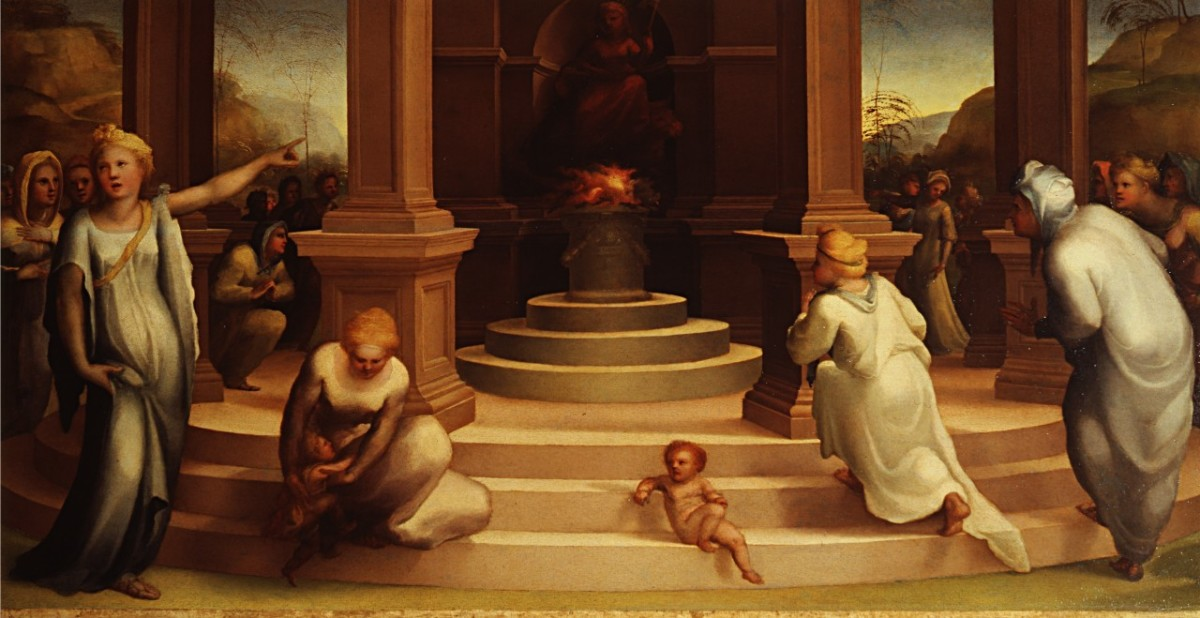
Cult of Vesta

== Partial anthology of works ==
- The Miraculous Communion of St Catherine of Siena (1513) – J. Paul Getty Museum, Los Angeles
- Saint Catherine of Siena Receiving the Stigmata (1513) – J. Paul Getty Museum, Los Angeles
- Trinity Triptych (1513) – Oil on wood, 152 x 228 cm, Pinacoteca Nazionale, Siena
- Holy Family with the Infant Saint John the Baptist (c. 1514–1515) – Uffizi, Florence
- Marriage of St Catherine (1514–1515) – Pinacoteca Nazionale, Siena
- Bellanti Madonna (c. 1515) – Pinacoteca Nazionale, Siena
- St. Paul (1515) – Oil on wood, 190 x 150 cm, Museo dell'Opera Metropolitana, Siena
- Marcia (1519), National Gallery, London
- Stigmatization of St. Catherine of Siena (1515) – Oil on wood, 208 x 156 cm, Pinacoteca Nazionale, Siena
- The Betrothal of the Virgin (1518) – Fresco, 295 x 304 cm, Oratory of San Bernardino, Siena
- Tanaquil (1519) – Oil on wood, 92 x 53 cm, National Gallery, London
- Self Portrait (1520)
- The Story of Papirius (1520–1530) – National Gallery, London
- St. Lucy (1521) – Oil on wood, Pinacoteca Nazionale, Siena
- Mystical Marriage of St. Catherine (1521) – Hermitage, St. Petersburg
- Holy Family with the Infant Saint John the Baptist (c.1521–1522) – Galleria Palatina, Florence
- Frescoes – Palazzo Bindi-Segardi, Siena
- Frescoes of scenes from Roman historyPalazzo Pubblico, Siena (1529–1535)
- The Holy Family with Young Saint John (1523–1524) – Oil on panel, diameter 86 cm, Museo Thyssen-Bornemisza, Madrid
- Fall of the Rebel Angels (c. 1524) – Pinacoteca Nazionale, Siena
- Fall of the Rebel Angels (c. 1528) – Oil on wood, 347 x 225 cm, San Niccolò al Carmine, Siena
- Mystic Marriage of Saint Catherine (1528) – Palazzo Chigi-Saracini, Siena
- Vision of St. Catherine of Sienna (1528) – Philbrook Museum of Art, Tulsa
- The Baptism of Christ (1528) – Philbrook Museum of Art, Tulsa
- The Nativity – Allentown Art Museum, Allentown
- Venus and Cupid with Vulcan (1528) – New Orleans Museum of Art, New Orleans
- Holy Family with St. John (c. 1530) – Oil on panel, diameter 84 cm, Uffizi, Florence
- Holy Family with Saint Anne – Private collection
- Flight of Clelia and the Roman Virgins – Uffizi, Florence
- Punishment of Dathan – Pisa Cathedral
- Drawing for Christ in Limbo (Stolen)
- Christ in Limbo (1535) – Pinacoteca Nazionale, Siena
- Moses and the Golden Calf (1536–1537) – Oil on wood, 197 x 139 cm, Pisa Cathedral
- Saint Bernard of Siena Preaching (1537) – Musée du Louvre, Paris
- Saint Anthony and the Miracle of the Mule (1537) – Musée du Louvre, Paris
- Saint Francis receives the stigmata (1537) – Musée du Louvre, Paris
- Coronation of the Virgin (1539) – Pinacoteca Nazionale, Siena
- Birth of the Virgin (1543) – Oil on wood, 233 x 145 cm, Accademia, Siena
- Sarteano Annunciation (c.1546) – Oil on canvas, San Martino in Foro, Sarteano
- Coronation of the Virgin (1540s) – Santo Spirito, Siena
- Madonna with infant and St. John (1540) – Oil on panel, 90 x 65 cm, Galleria Nazionale d'Arte Antica, Rome
- Holy Family with Angels – National Gallery of Art, Washington, DC
- Holy Family and St. John – Alte Pinakothek, Munich
- Statues of Angels (1548–1550) – Presbytery of Siena Cathedral
- Judith with the Head of Holofernes – The Wallace Collection, London.
- Drawing of Abraham
- St. Peter – Woodcut, Cleveland Museum of Art
- Angels drawing (1524–25) – San Francisco

== Gallery ==
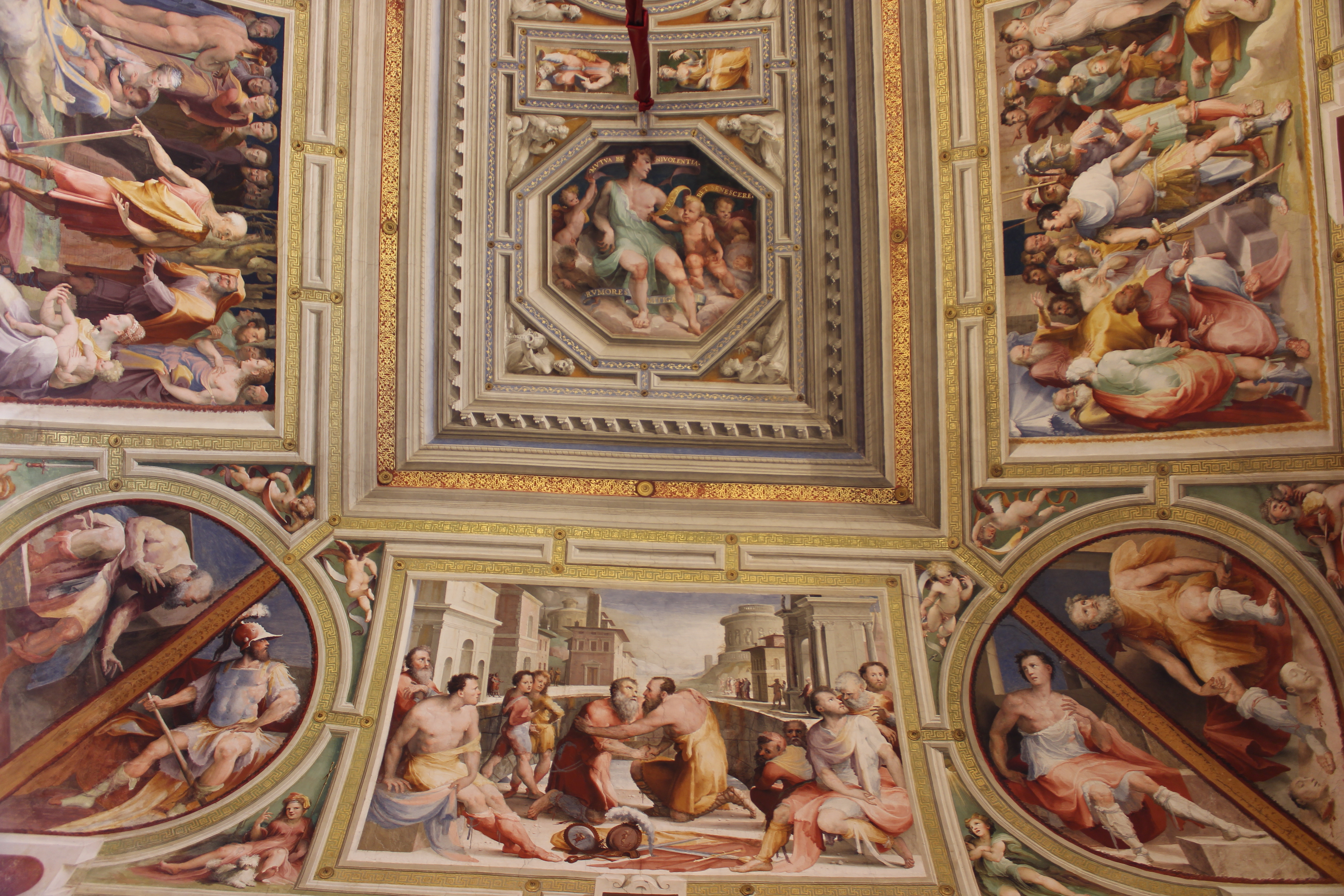
Frescoes at Palazzo Pubblico in Siena

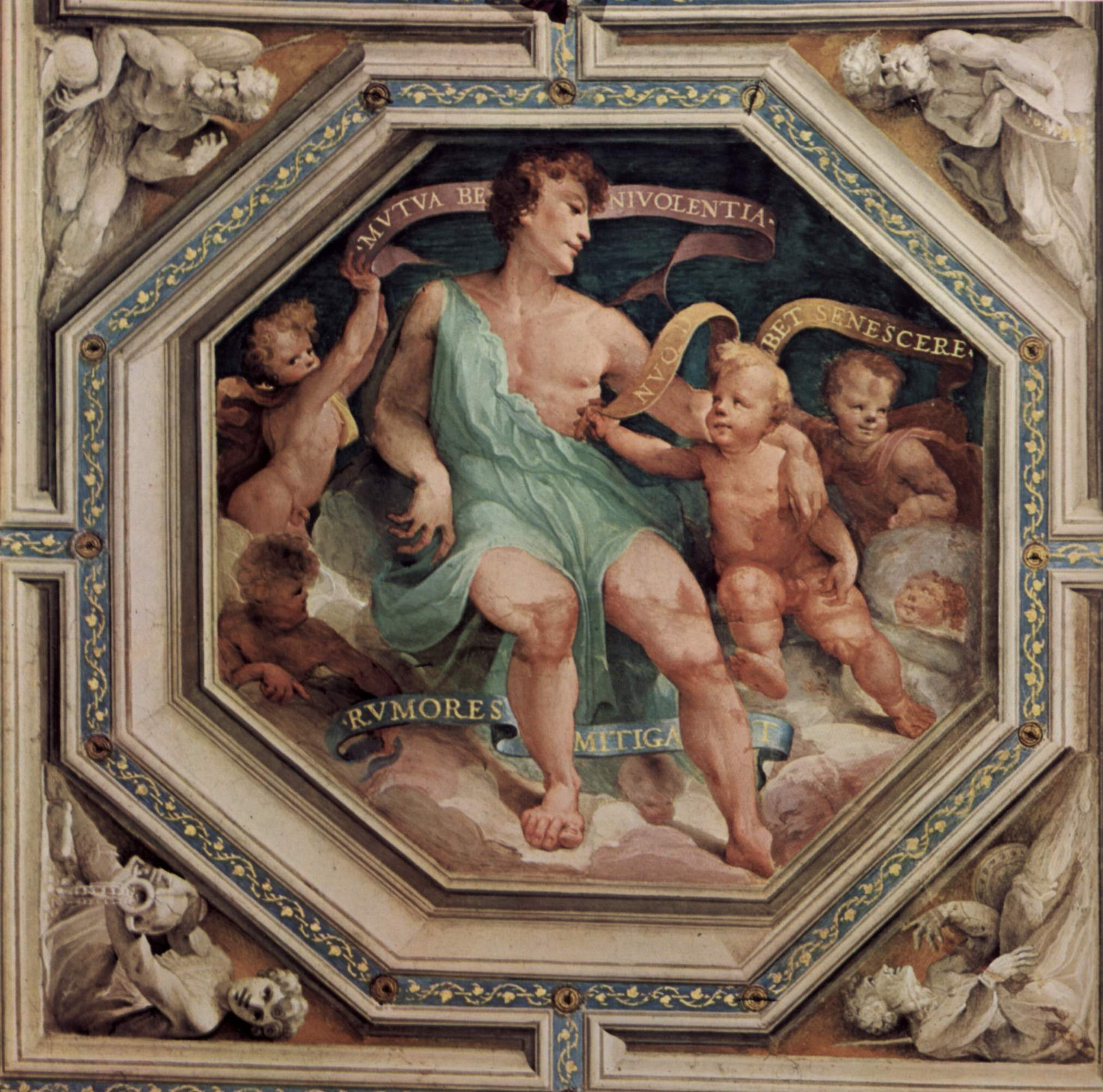
Allegory of Concord (1532–1535)

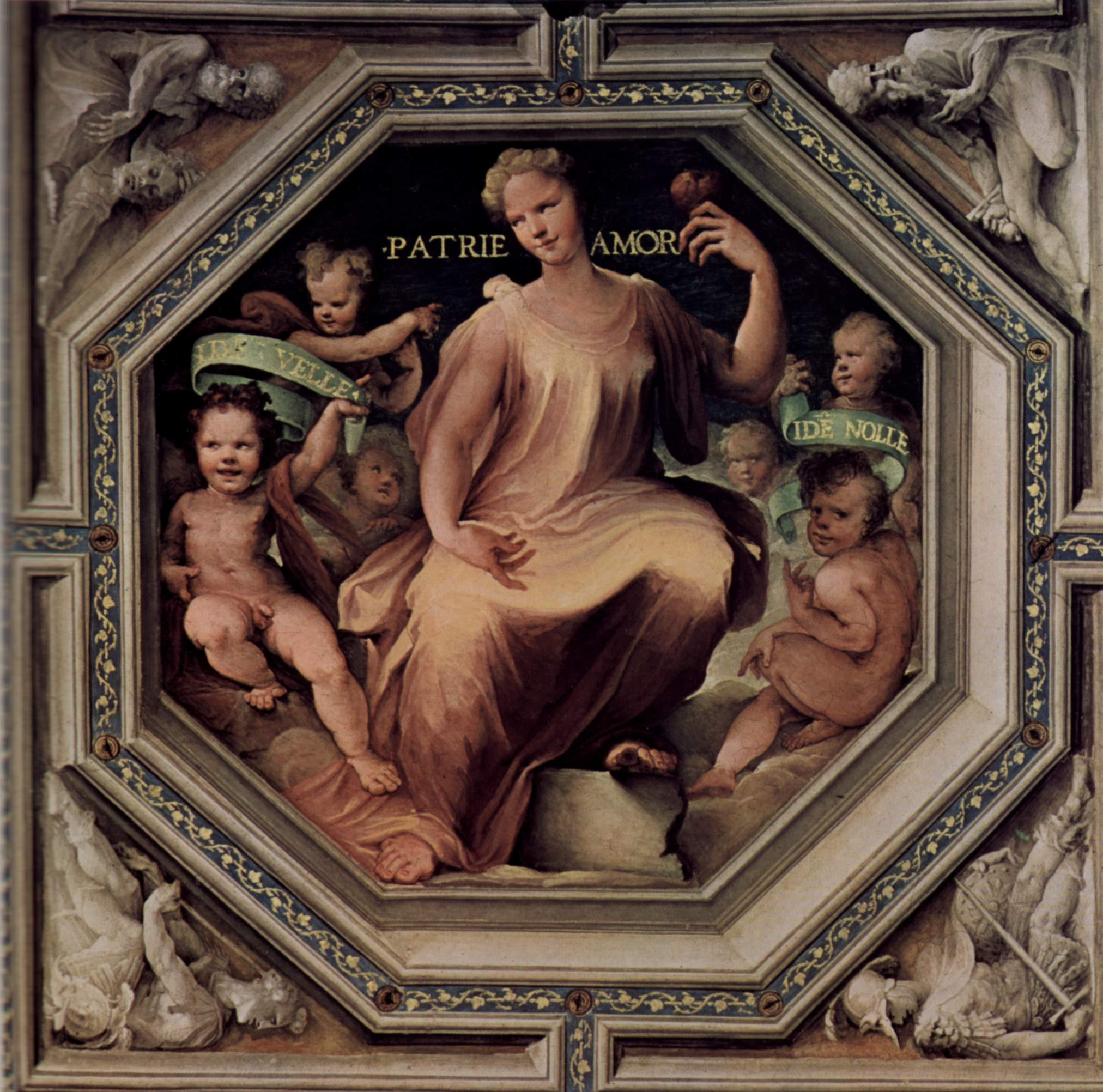
Caritas (1532–1535)

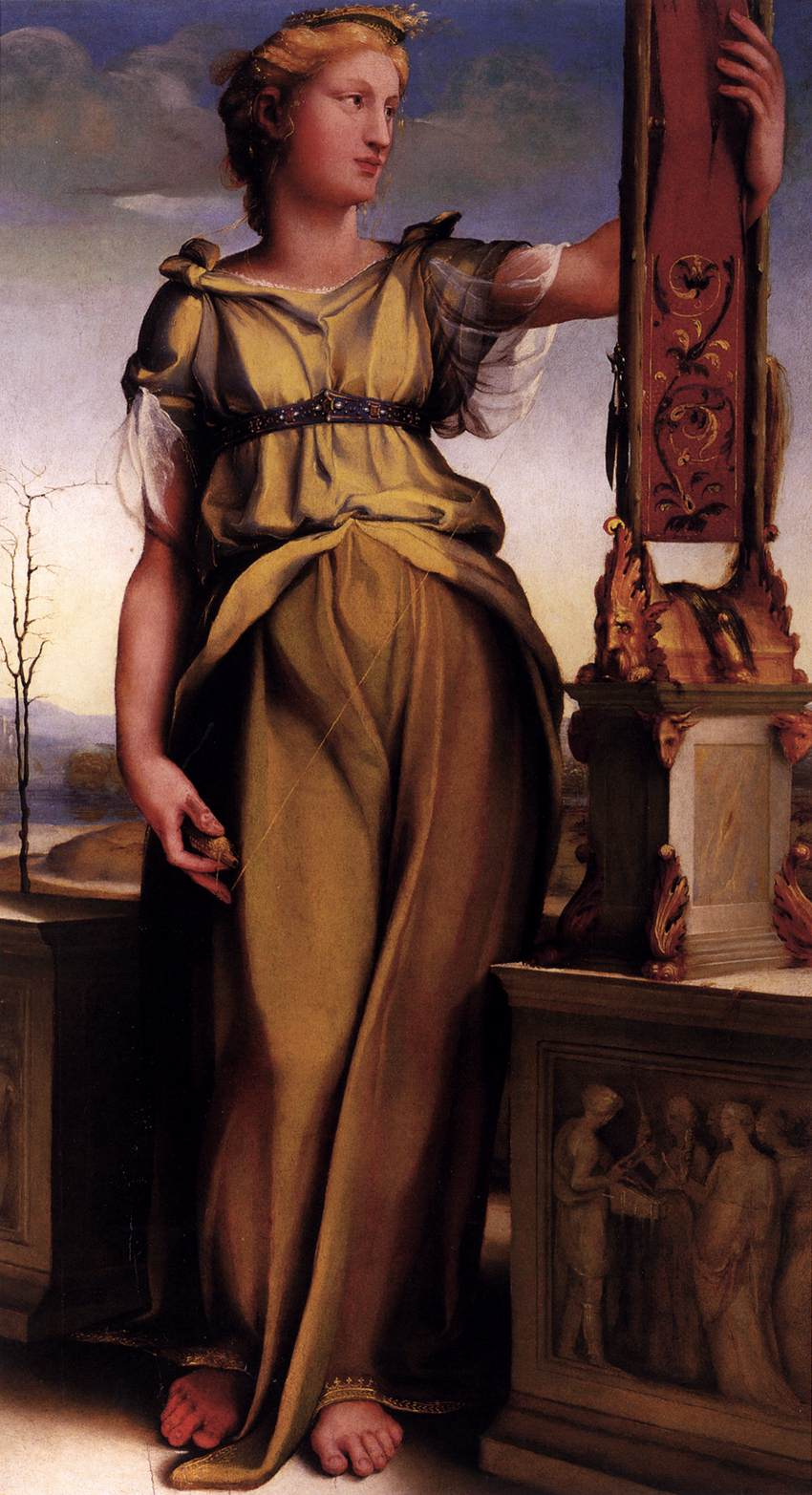
Penelope (1514)

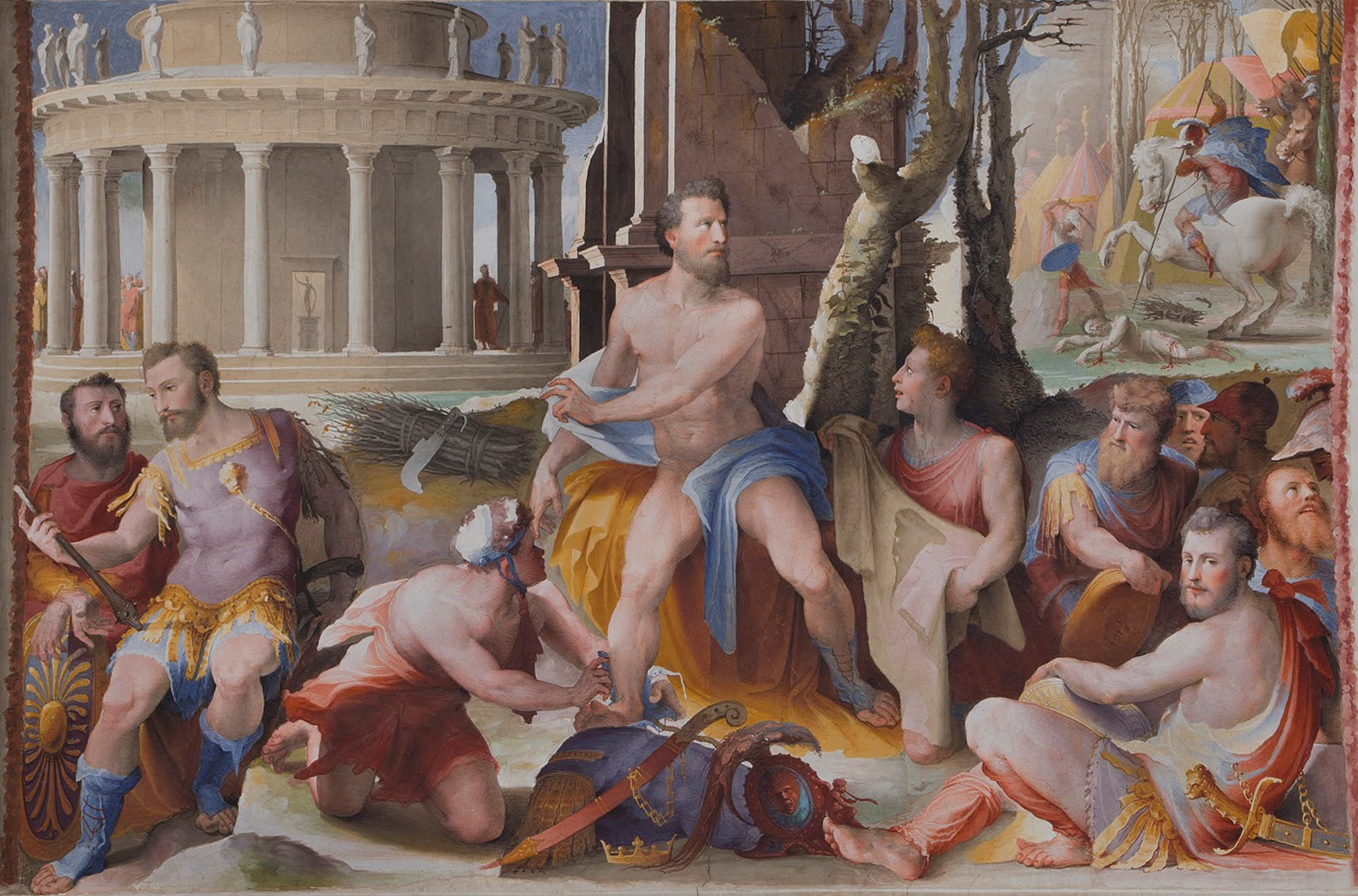
The Sacrifice of King Codrus of Athens (1529 – 1535)

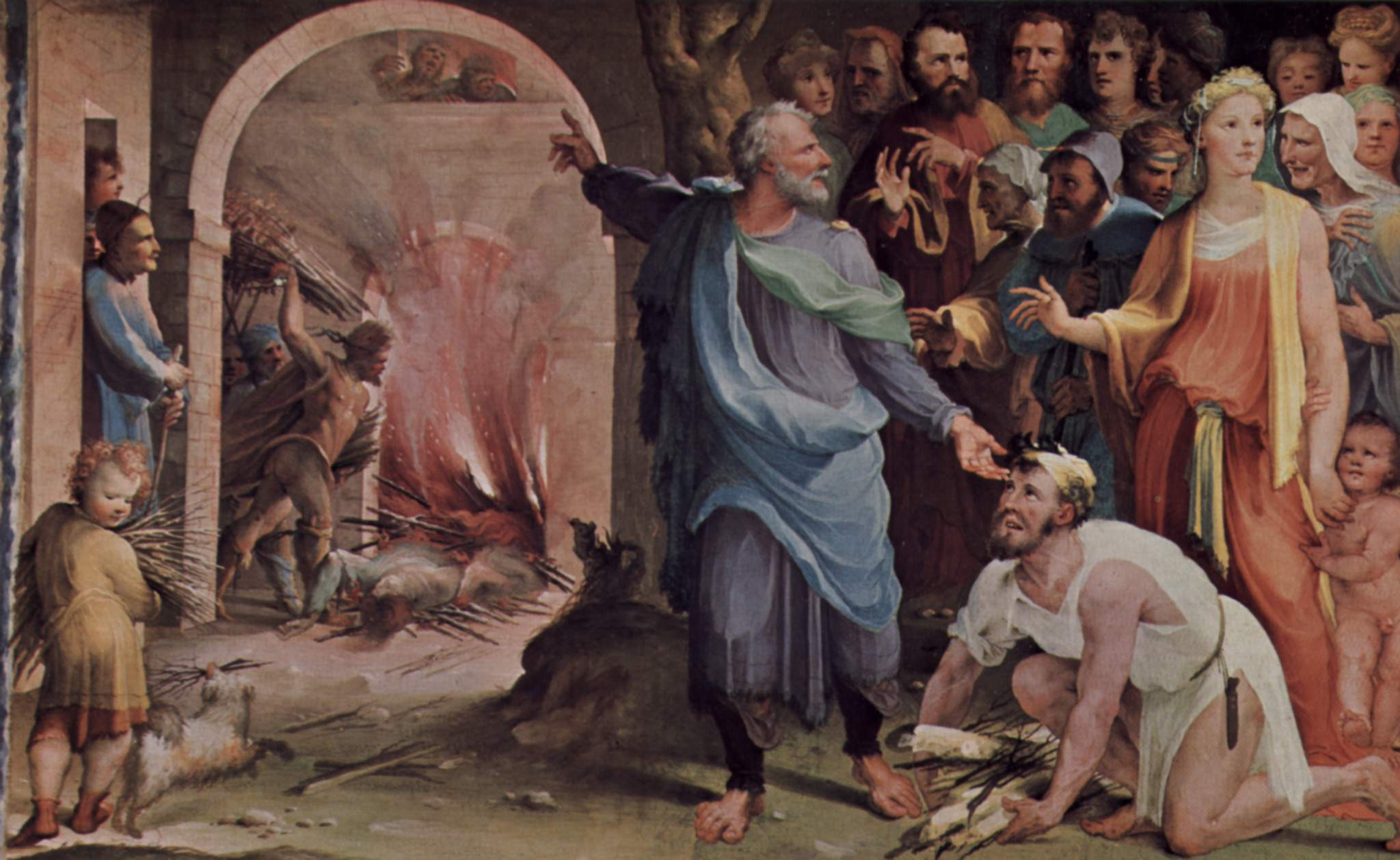
Tribune Publius Mucius Scaevola sends his allies to the stake (1532–1535)

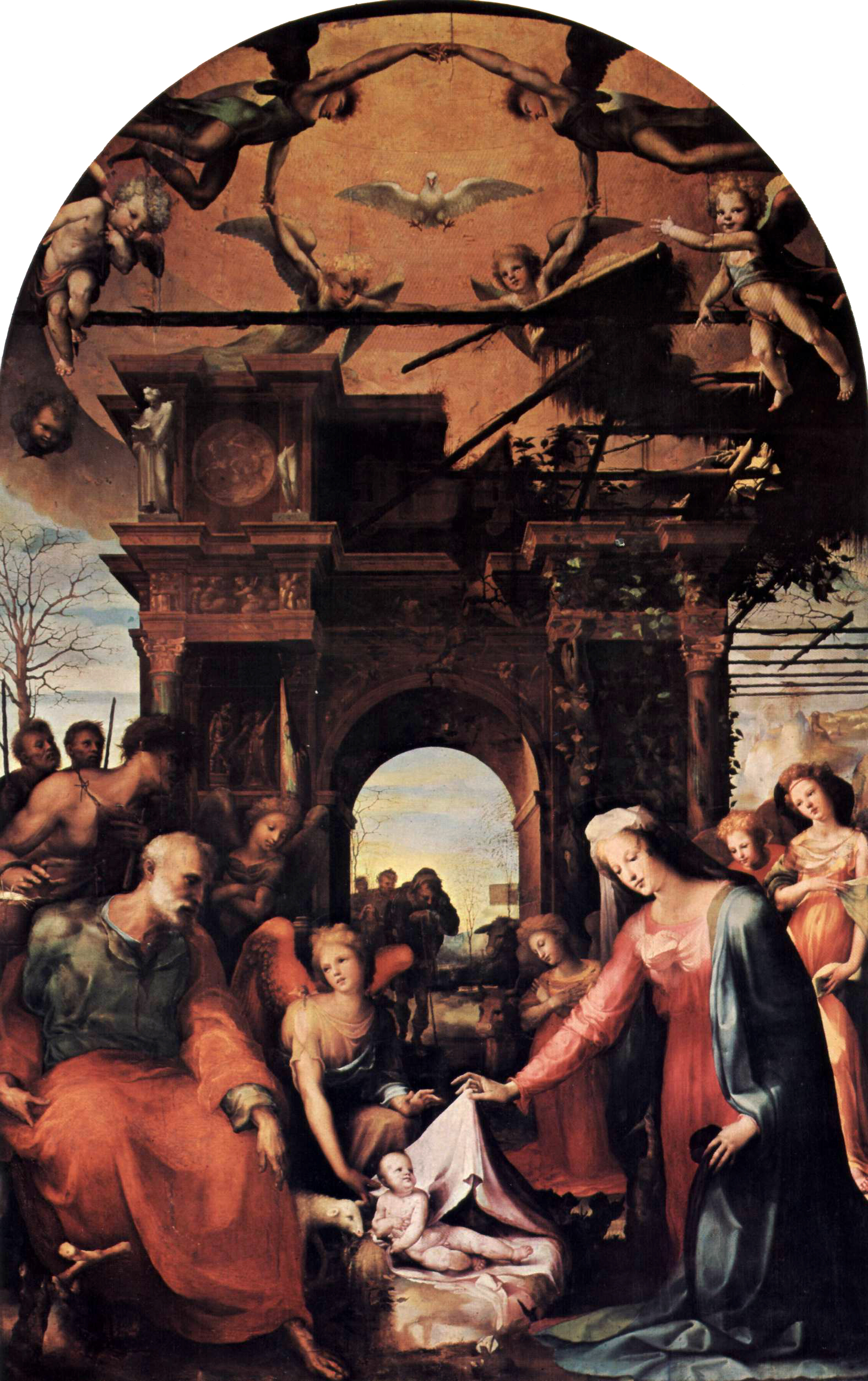
Birth of Christ (1523–1524)

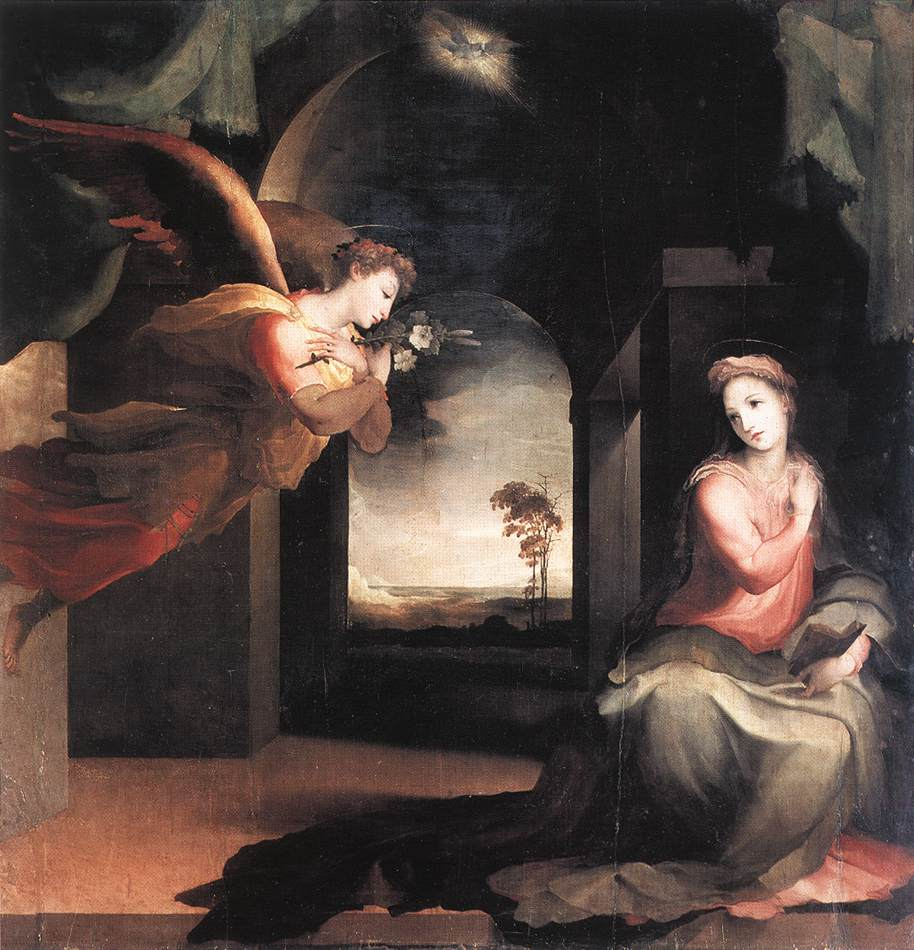
The Annunciation (1545)

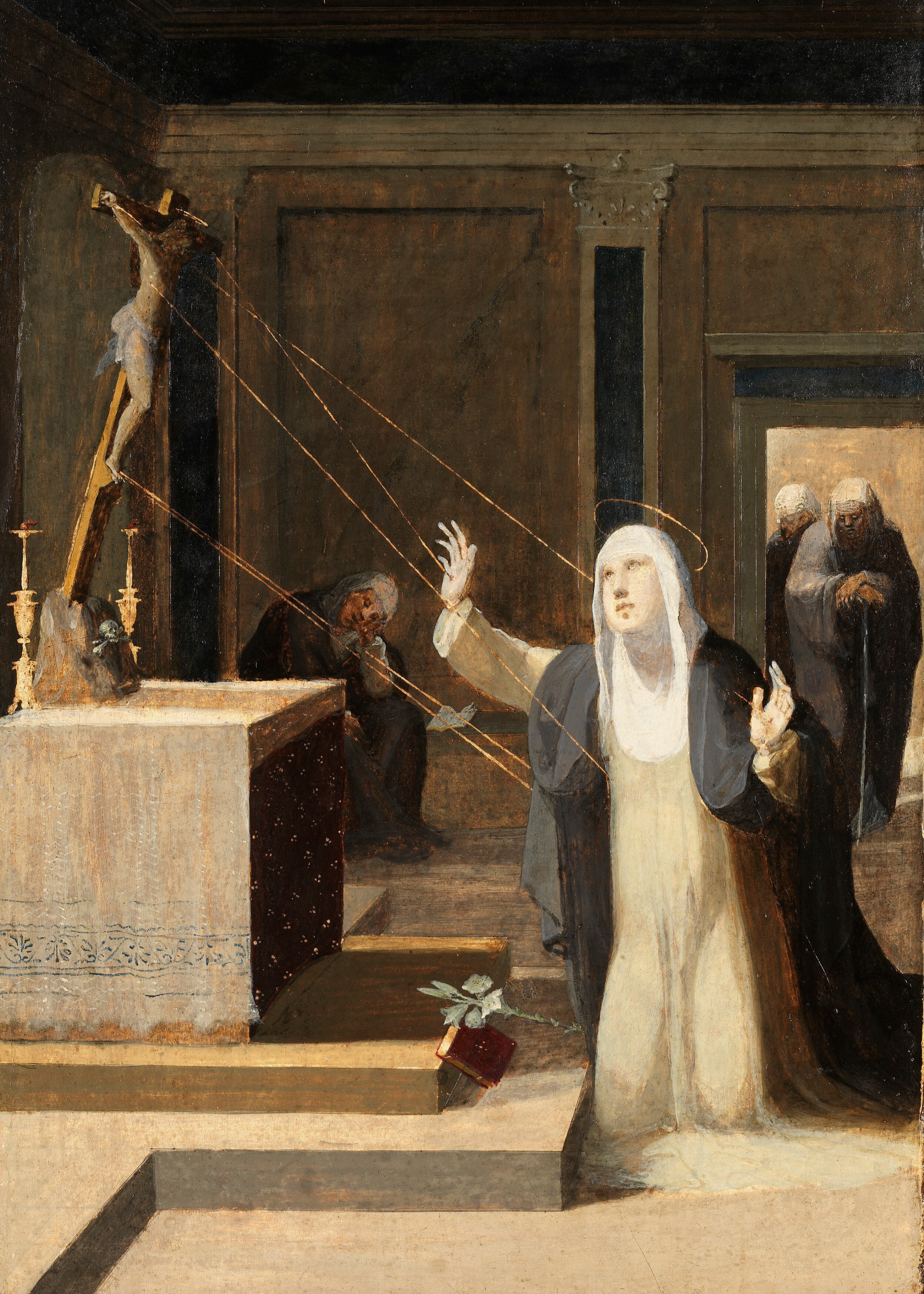
Saint Catherine receives the stigmata (1545)

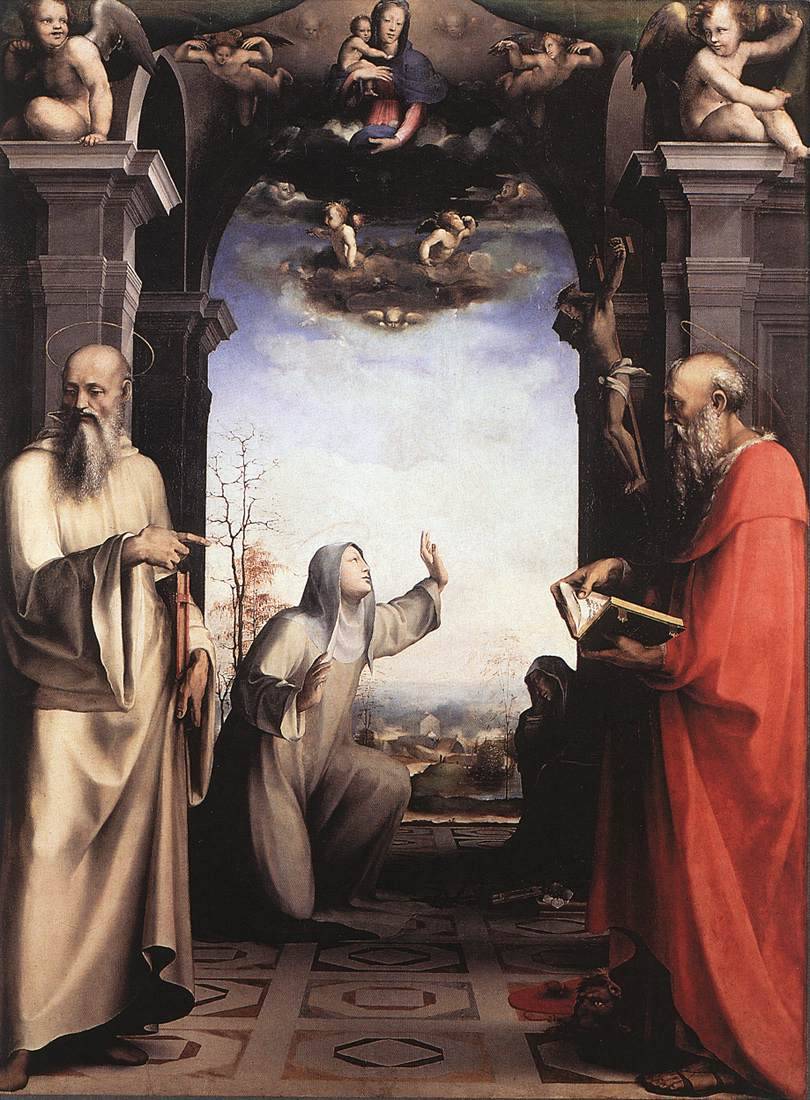
Stigmatization of St Catherine of Siena (1515)

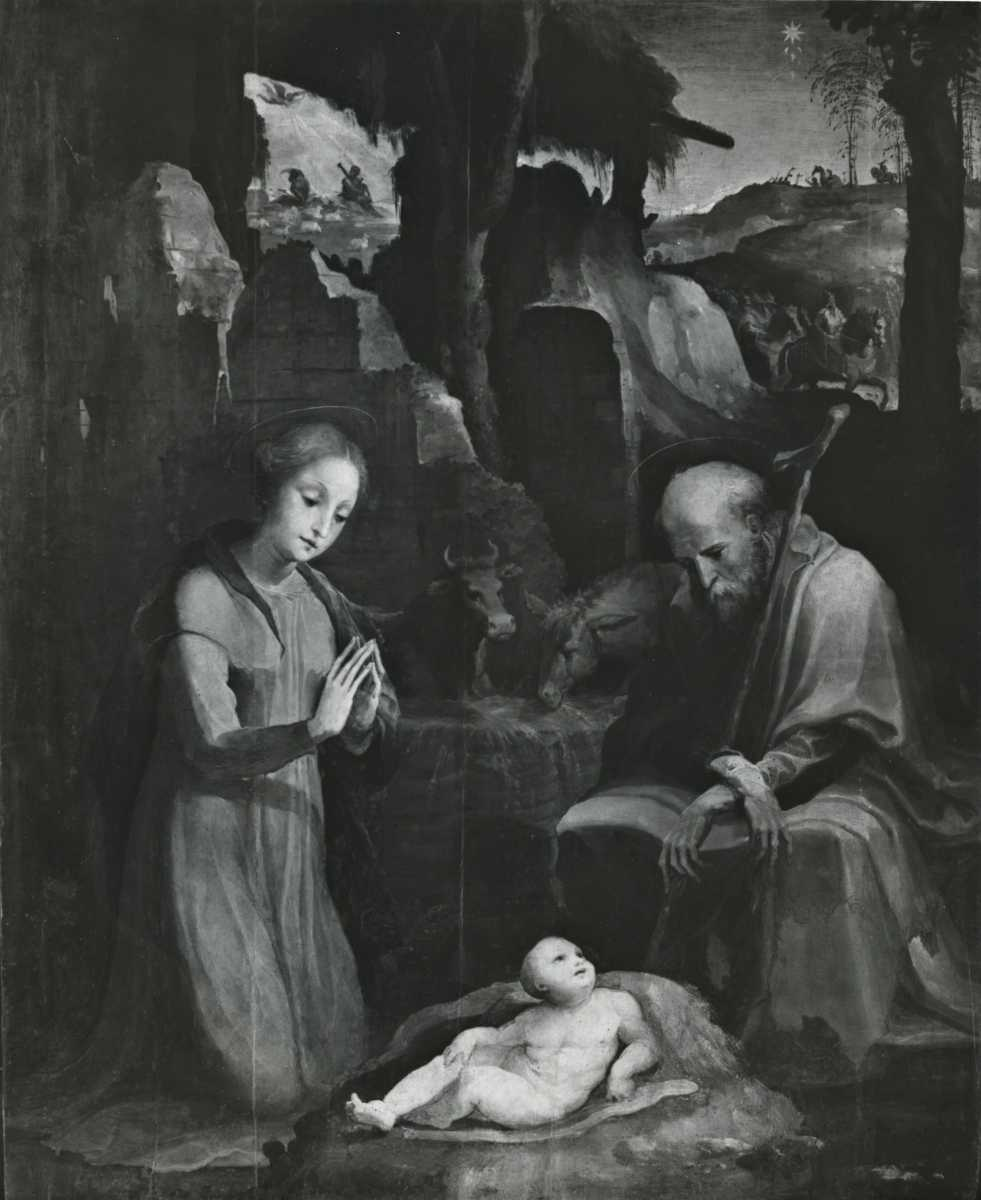
Nativity of Jesus, Diocesan Museum

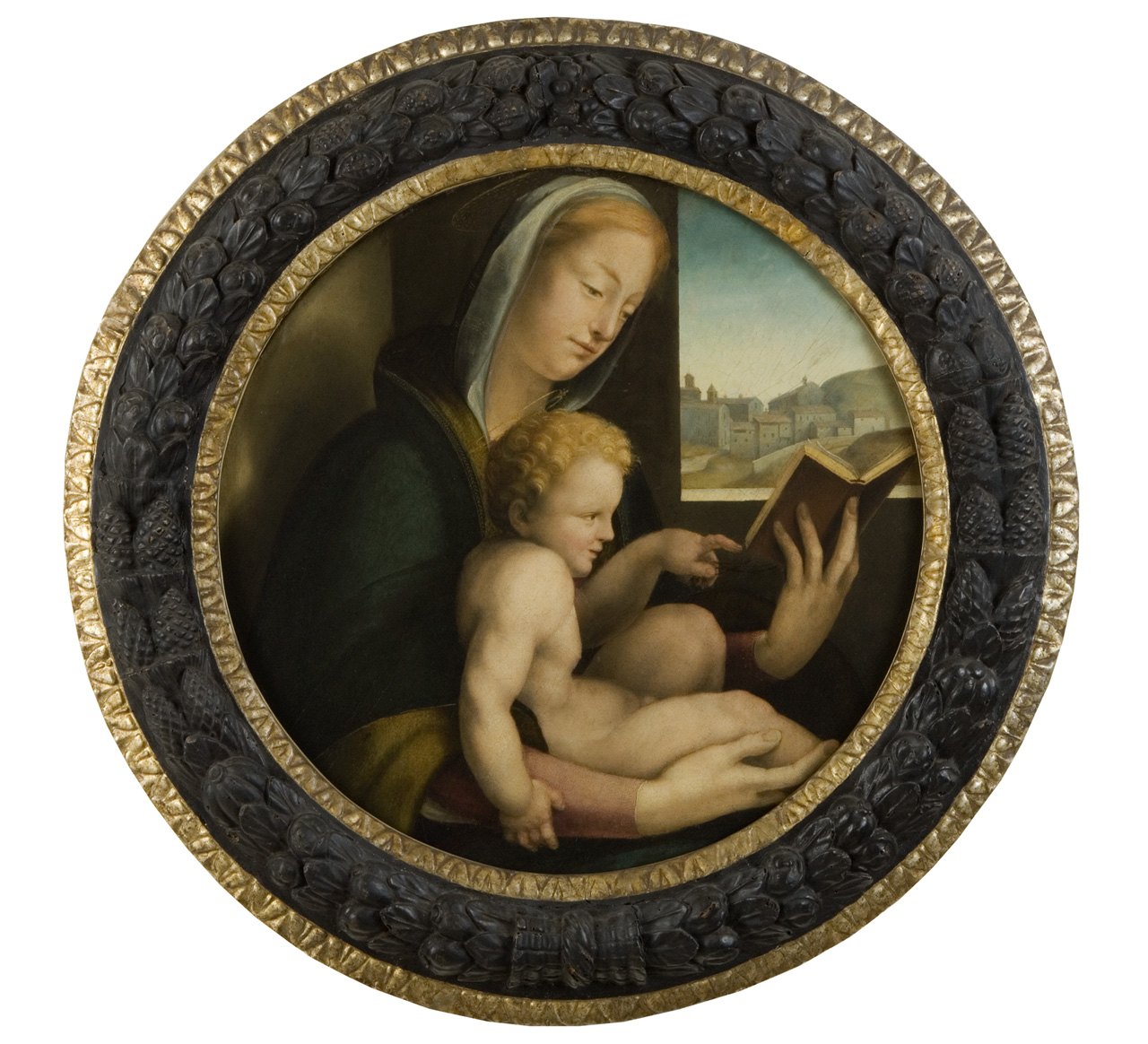
Madonna and Child (1514)
