= Palazzo Celsi Pollini =

Coordinates: 43.3142°N 11.3279°E

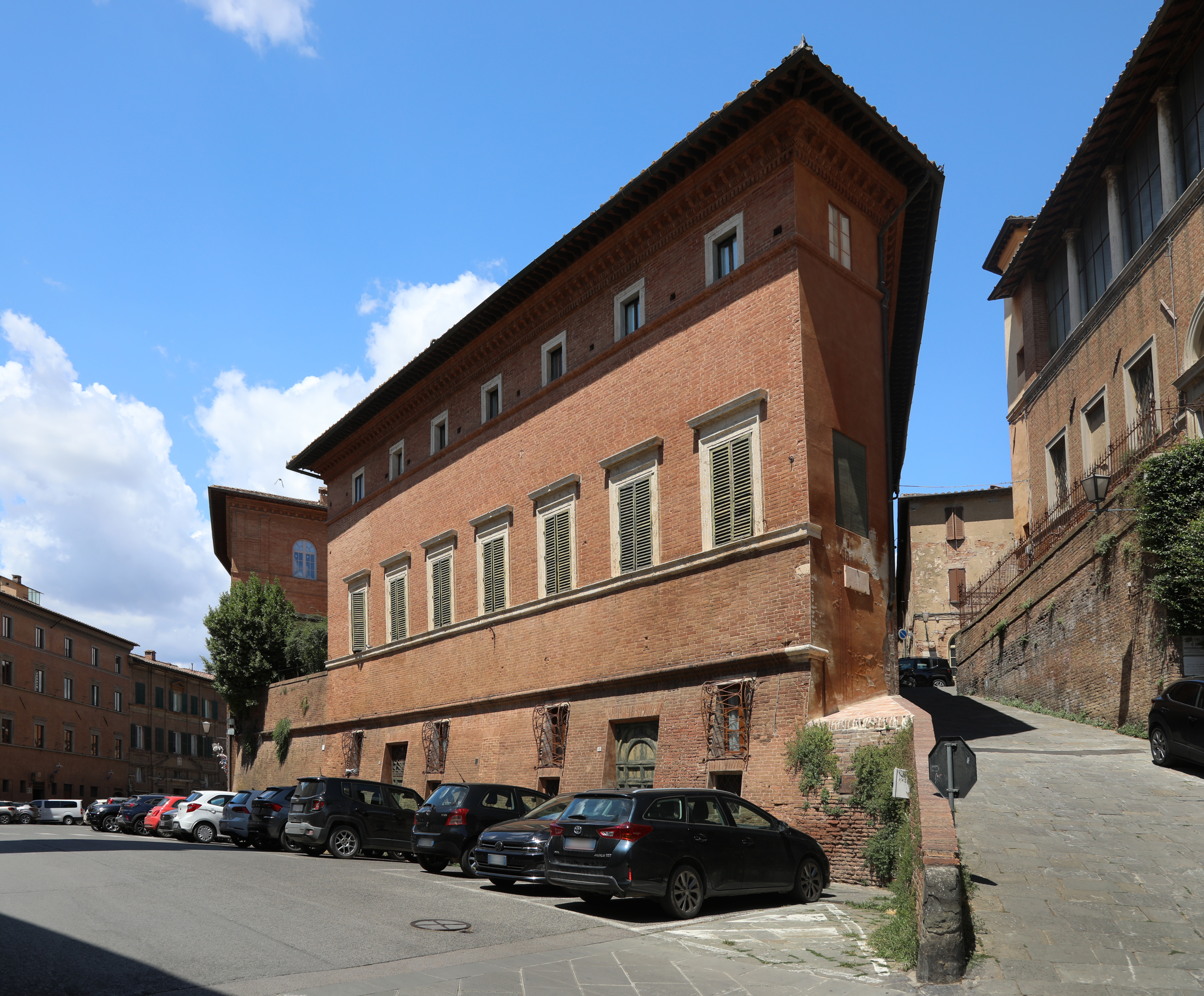
Palazzo Celsi Pollini

The Palazzo Celsi Pollini, once also called the Palazzo del Vescovo, is a Renaissance style urban palace in Siena, Italy. It is located on Pian dei Mantellini #39-41, at the corner with Via San Quirico. A 19th-century source refers to the house as Casa Campioni. The main facade faces the campanile of San Niccolò del Carmine.

== History ==
The polygonal palace built into the slope of the hill was built in 1525 using designs by Baldassarre Peruzzi. It was refurbished over the centuries. The interiors conserve frescoes attributed to the studio of Bartolomeo Neroni, also called il "Riccio", such as a Susanna and the Elders and The Continence of Scipio. The Celsi family produced the 16th-century Sienese ambassador Mino Celsi who fled to Switzerland due to accusations of heresy.

The palace is a private residence.

== Sources ==
- Siena Guida Virtuale entry on Pian dei Mantellini.
