= Girolamo del Pacchia =

15th/16th-century Italian painter

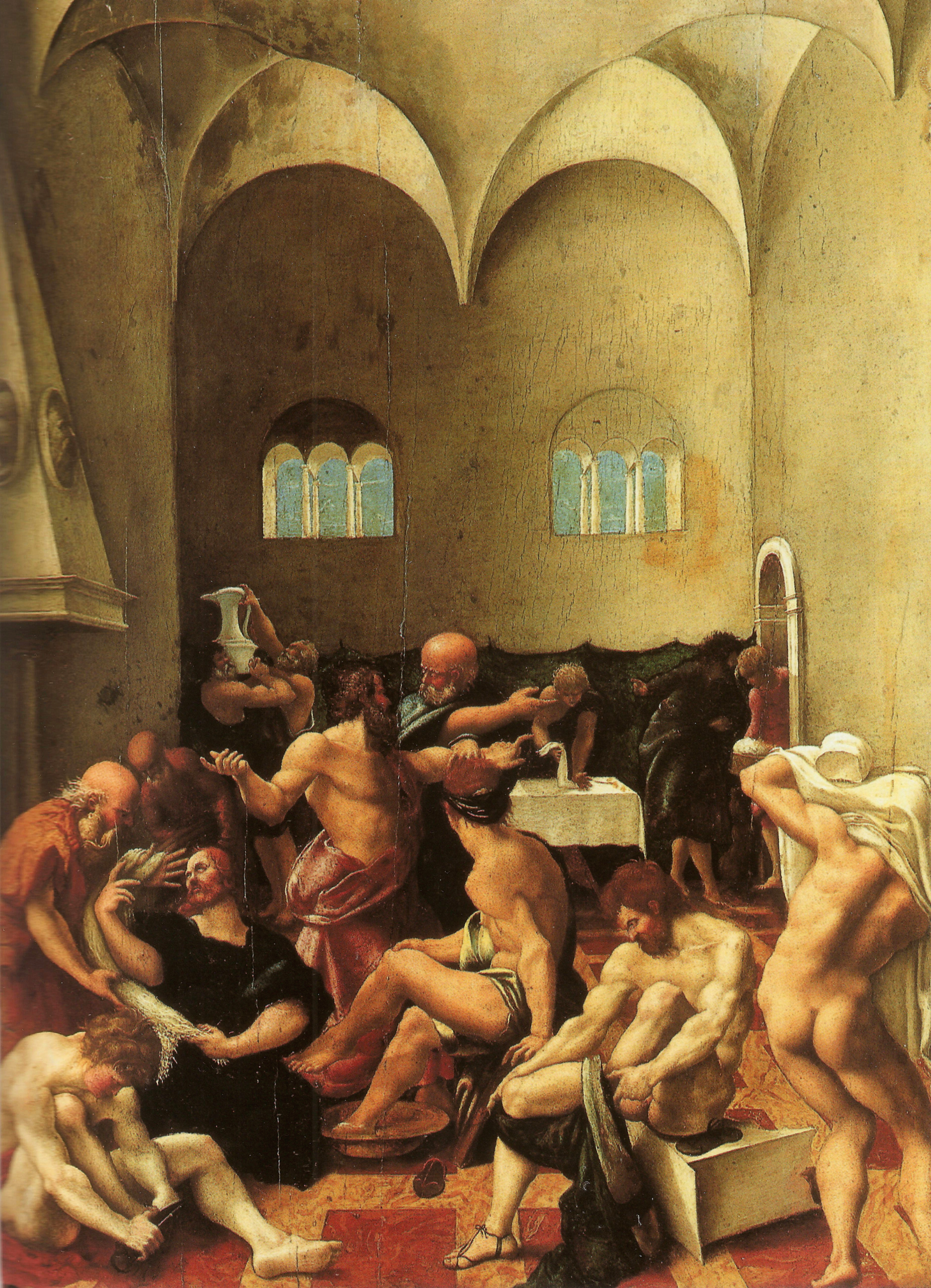
The Washing of the Feet by Girolamo del Pacchia, Musée des Beaux-Arts de Strasbourg, 1520

Girolamo del Pacchia (c. 1477 – after 1533), was an Italian painter.

== Life ==
He was born, probably in Siena, son of a Hungarian cannon-founder.

Having joined a turbulent club named the Bardotti he disappeared from Siena in 1535, when the club was dispersed, and nothing of a later date is known about him. His most celebrated work is a fresco of the Nativity of the Virgin, in the Oratory of San Bernardino, Siena, a work cited as graceful and tender, with a certain artificiality.

Another fresco, in the church of Santa Caterina, Siena, represents that saint on her visit to St Agnes of Montepulciano, who, having just expired, raises her foot by miracle. In the National Gallery, London there is a "Virgin and Child."

The forms of G. del Pacchia are fuller than those of Perugino (his principal model of style appears to have been in reality Franciabigio); the drawing is not always unexceptionable; the female heads have sweetness and beauty of feature, and some of the colouring has noticeable force.
