= Holy Family =

Christian term for Jesus, Mary and Joseph

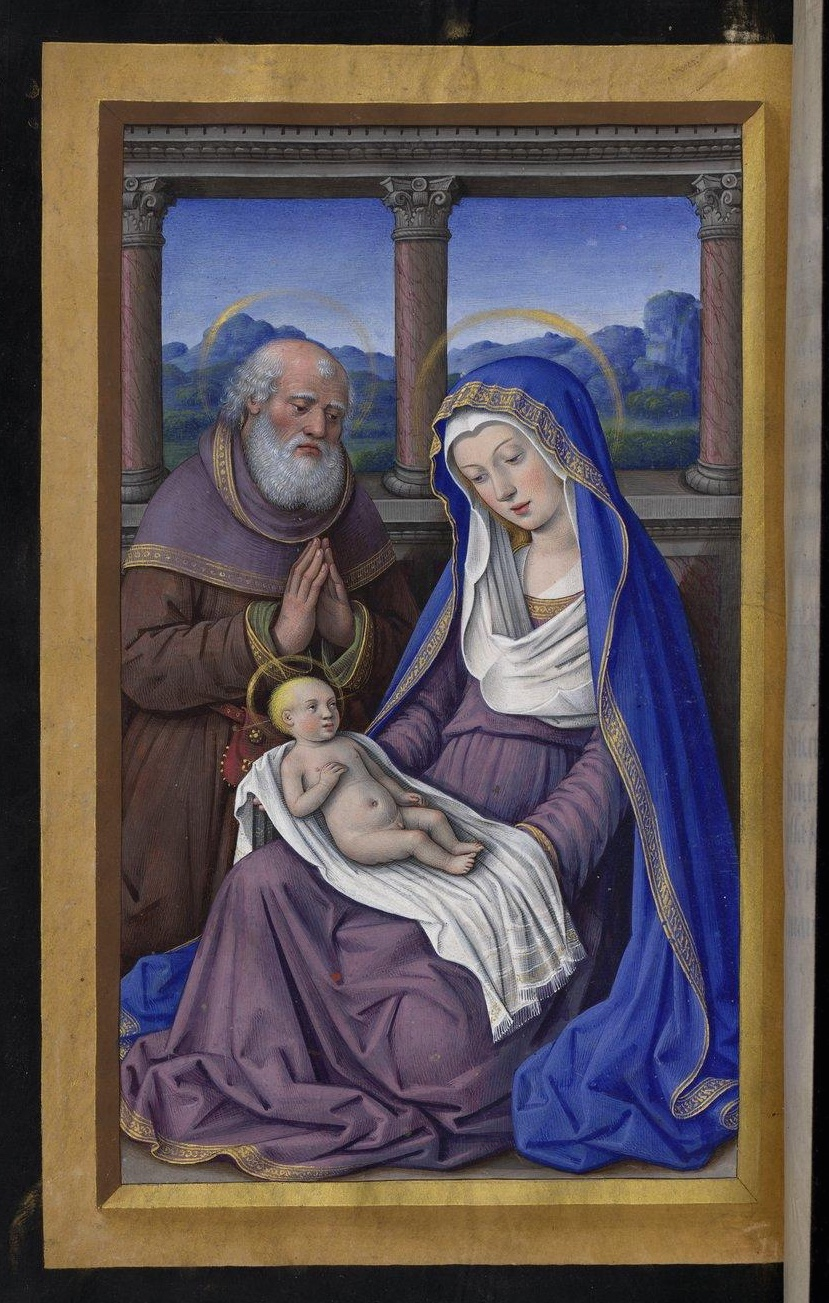
Miniature in the Grandes Heures of Anne of Brittany, 1503–1508, by Jean Bourdichon

The Holy Family consists of the Child Jesus, the Blessed Virgin Mary and Saint Joseph. The subject became popular in Christian art from the 1490s on, but veneration of the Holy Family was formally begun in the 17th century by Saint François de Laval, the first bishop of New France, who founded a confraternity.

The Gospels speak little of the life of the Holy Family in the years before Jesus' public ministry. Matthew and Luke narrate the episodes from this period of Christ's life, namely his circumcision and later Presentation, the flight to Egypt, the return to Nazareth, and the Finding in the Temple. Joseph and Mary were apparently observant Jews, as Luke narrates that they brought Jesus with them on the annual pilgrimage to Jerusalem with other Jewish families.

== Veneration ==
The Feast of the Holy Family is a liturgical celebration in the Catholic Church, as well as in many Lutheran and Anglican churches, in honour of Jesus of Nazareth, his mother, the Blessed Virgin Mary, and his foster father, Saint Joseph, as a family. The primary purpose of this feast is to present the Holy Family as a model for Christian families.

From the 17th century, the feast has been celebrated at a local and regional level and at that level was promoted by Pope Leo XIII, who authorised the establishment of the feast of the Holy Family shortly after the Epiphany in any diocese which chose to request it. In 1921, Pope Benedict XV made it part of the General Roman Calendar and set it on the Sunday within the Octave of the Epiphany (cf. Epiphanytide), that is to say, on the Sunday between 7 and 13 January and January, all inclusive (see General Roman Calendar of 1954).

In the General Roman Calendar of 1954, the Sunday within the Octave of Christmas was in fact celebrated on the Sunday only if it fell on 29, 30 or 31 December, since it gave way to the higher-ranked feasts of Saint Stephen, Saint John the Apostle and the Holy Innocents; otherwise, it was transferred to December 30, and if the feast of Saint Thomas Becket, one of the most popular additions to the calendar in the Middle Ages, was celebrated in double rite (as it was universally after 1907), then it too took precedence over this Sunday, until the 1911 reforms where double feasts no longer did so automatically. The 1962 Roman Missal, whose use is still authorized per the 2007 motu proprio Summorum Pontificum, follows the General Roman Calendar of 1960, which ranks the Sunday within the Octave of Christmas as higher than these saints and keeps the Feast of the Holy Family on the Sunday after Epiphany.

The 1969 revision of the General Roman Calendar moved the celebration of the Holy Family to the Sunday within the Octave of Christmas, that is, the Sunday between Christmas Day and New Year's Day (both exclusive), or if both Christmas Day and the Solemnity of Mary, Mother of God are Sundays, on 30 December. When not celebrated on a Sunday, it is not a holy day of obligation. In the General Roman Calendar of 1969 the Feast of the Holy Family outranks the various saints whose feastdays fall during the Octave of Christmas, since it is usually to be celebrated on a Sunday.

== In art ==
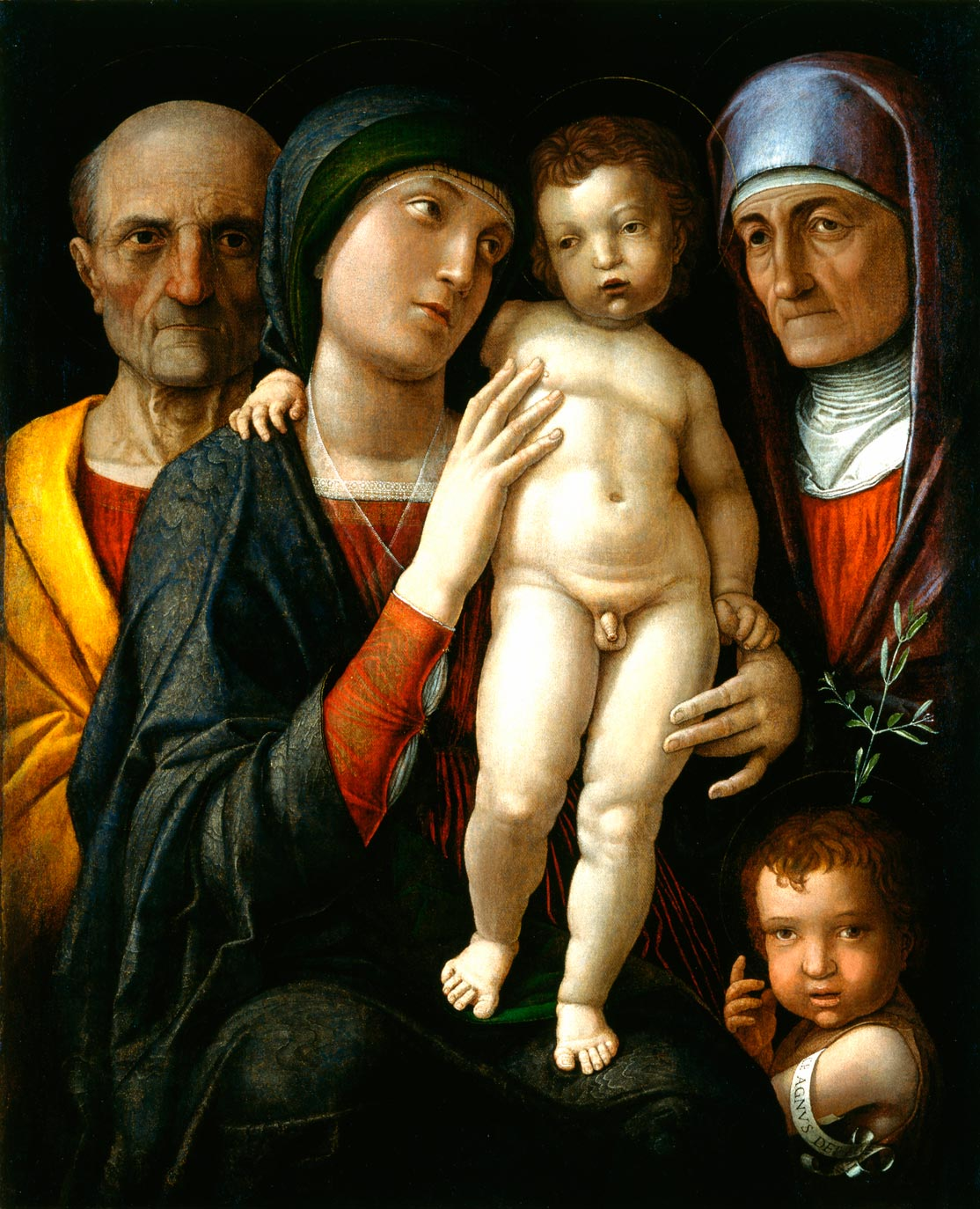
Holy Family with Saints Anne and John the Baptist, Andrea Mantegna, 1495–1500

The Holy Family became a subject popular in art in the early 16th century, in both Italian Renaissance painting and Dutch and Flemish Renaissance painting. The popularity of the subject was associated with an increased interest in, and devotion to, Saint Joseph. In the later Middle Ages he had become something of a comic figure, whose age was emphasized, and was often shown asleep in Nativity scenes. In the 15th century confraternities dedicated to Joseph were part of revived devotional interest, who is now at least awake, and often shown taking an active role in parenting.

Many early Holy Family compositions are either Nativity scenes or the Rest on the Flight into Egypt with the removal of other event-specific elements, such as the ox and ass of the Nativity, to concentrate on the three main figures for devotional images, mostly intended for wealthy homes. Alternatively many compositions clearly derive from a Madonna and Child, with a Saint Joseph added. Often the figures were shown close-up, filling much of the picture space.

Related variants add Jesus's slightly older cousin, Saint John the Baptist, and often his mother Saint Elizabeth; but Joseph is often absent in these, removing them from the usual definition of a Holy Family. It was thought that the Holy Family stayed with Elizabeth on their return from Egypt, and these pictures tend to show the children older than newborns. The extended family of Jesus, already popular as a subject in art, is called the Holy Kinship; this might include up to twenty figures.

=== Italy ===
The Parte Guelfa Holy Family by Luca Signorelli dates from about 1490. Mantegna appears to have invented the very tightly focused group in the late 1490s, painting several variants with John the Baptist and his mother, such as one now in Dresden. Some of these have standing or vertical infants, mostly toddlers rather than new-borns.

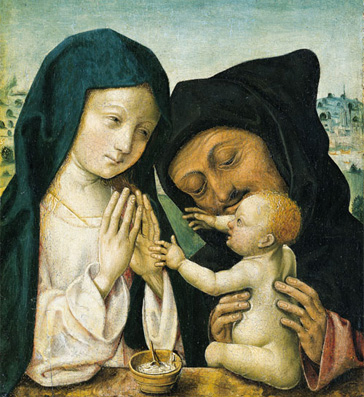
Master of the Saint Bartholomew Altarpiece, c. 1500

By the High Renaissance many Italian paintings had a horizontal format. The subject was popular with Antonio da Correggio (examples are in Pavia, Orléans, the Royal Collection, Los Angeles and Mantua), and Domenico Beccafumi (examples in Munich, Galleria Palatina, Florence and also the Uffizi there). Michelangelo's tempera rendition (c. 1506) hangs in the Uffizi in Florence, Italy. A Holy Family by Giulio Romano is in the Prado, with another at the Getty Center in Los Angeles, California.

Lorenzo Lotto also painted the subject several times, tending to add angels and saints from later periods, to produce versions of a sacra conversazione. Examples are Holy Family with Saint Catherine of Alexandria, Holy Family with St Jerome and St Anne, as well as one in the Louvre with the families of Jesus and John the Baptist.

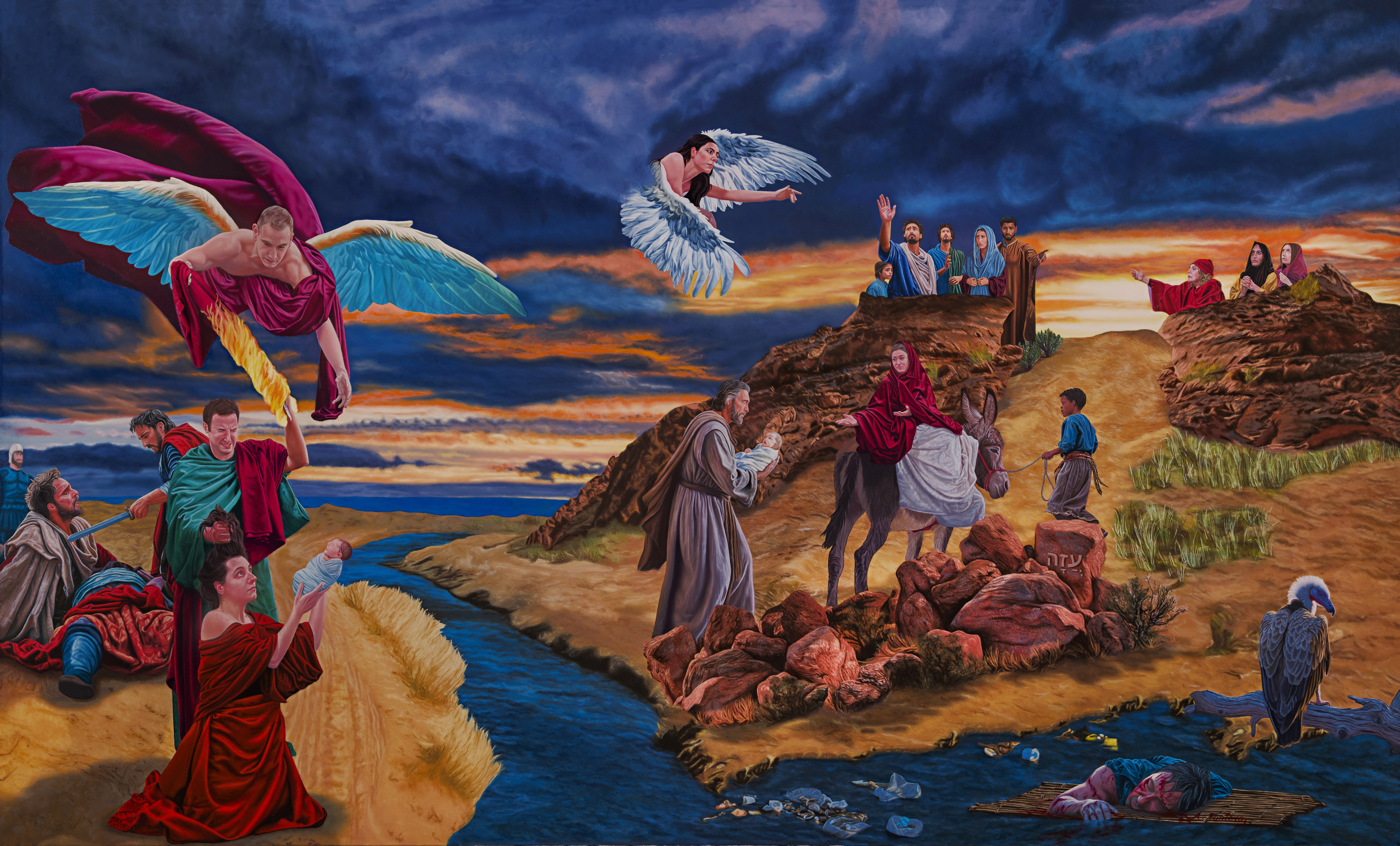
The Exiled Family, Alessandro Fantera, 2025, Palace of San Callisto, Vatican

A work by the artist Alessandro Fantera, created for the Dicastery for Promoting Integral Human Development, was presented on 16 January 2026 at the conclusion of the Holy Year. The ceremony took place at the Palazzo San Callisto in Rome, in the presence of Cardinal Michael Czerny SJ, Prefect of the Dicastery, and Monsignor Jozef Barlaš, Undersecretary of the same Dicastery. The work depicts a dramatic moment of the Holy Family's Flight into Egypt, symbolically setting it within the context of the Gaza Strip. This is a project of innovation from an iconographic perspective: in art history, representations of this event are rare and more frequently tied to the theme of the "Rest" rather than the more tragic theme of the "Flight" itself.

=== Northern Europe ===
North of the Alps, prints from the 1490s by Albrecht Dürer probably preceded any paintings. An early northern painting is by the Master of the Saint Bartholomew Altarpiece c. 1500, where the composition has clearly been freshly imagined. By contrast, the Holy Family by the Dutch artist Joos van Cleve of c. 1512 in the New York Metropolitan Museum of Art, essentially reduces Jan van Eyck's Lucca Madonna to a close-up with still-life details, and adds Saint Joseph over the Virgin's shoulder.

=== Gallery ===
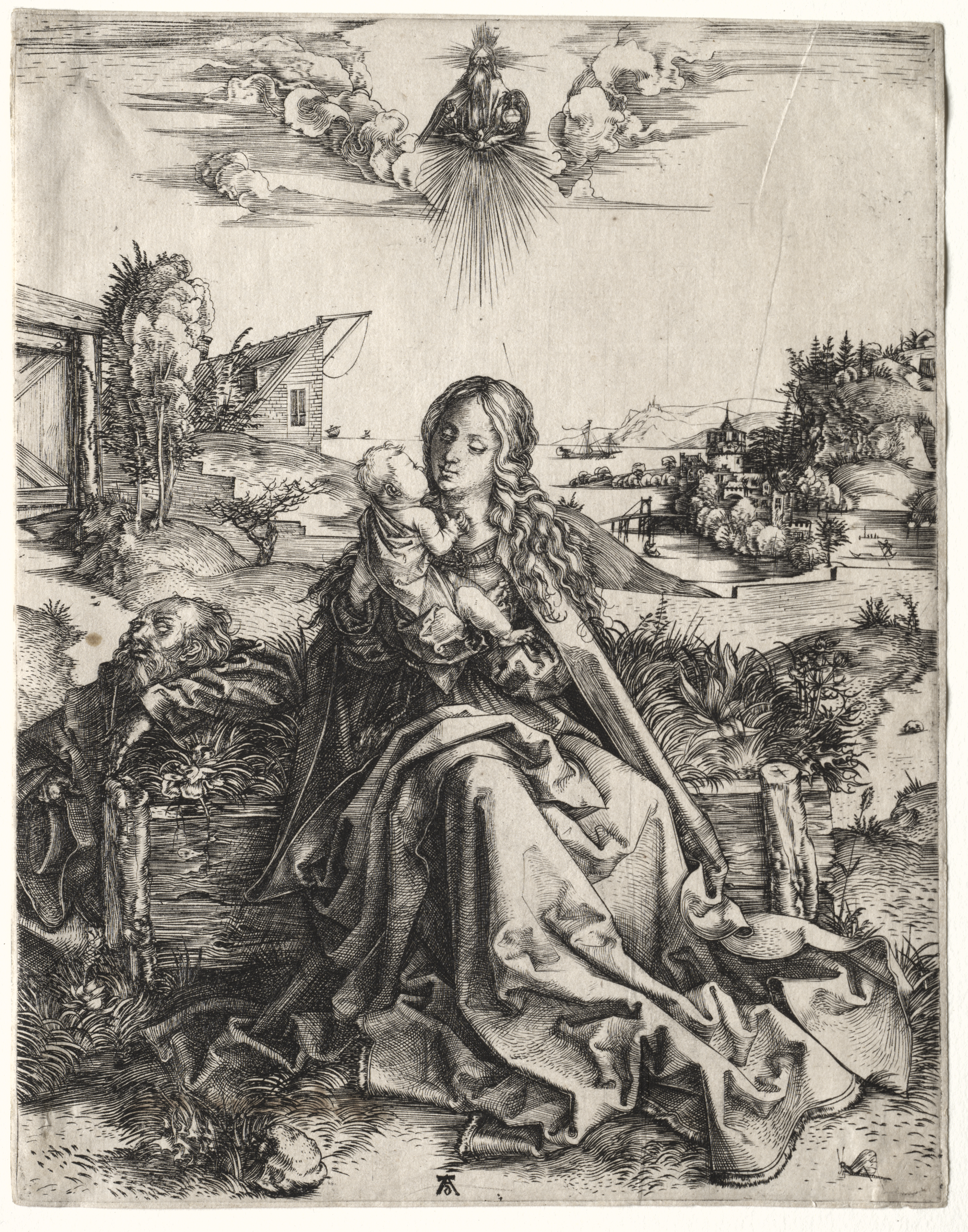
The Holy Family with the Dragonfly, Albrecht Dürer, 1495, engraving; Joseph is asleep.

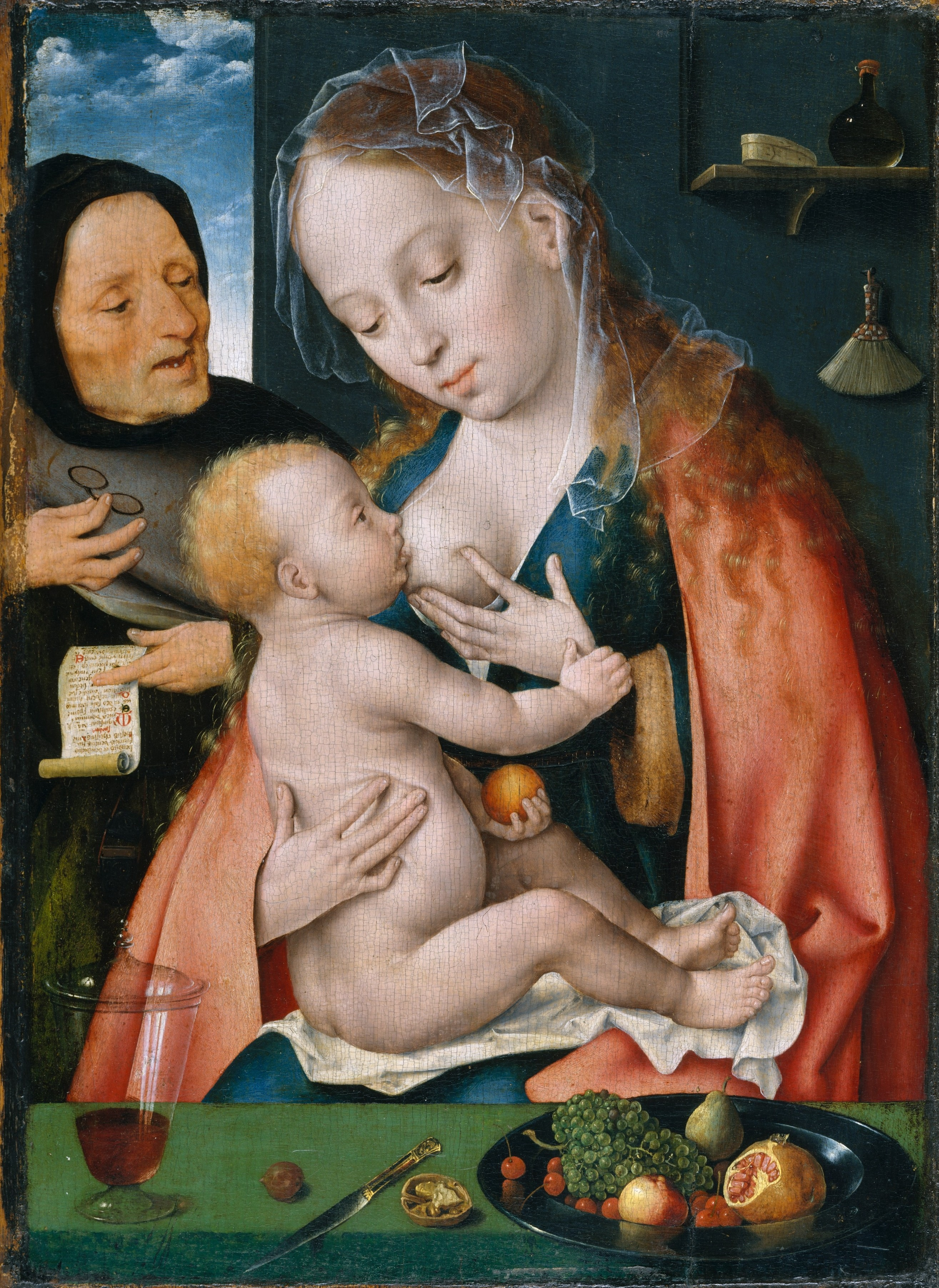
Joos van Cleve, Metropolitan Museum of Art, c. 1512, adapting a van Eyck Madonna with Joseph added

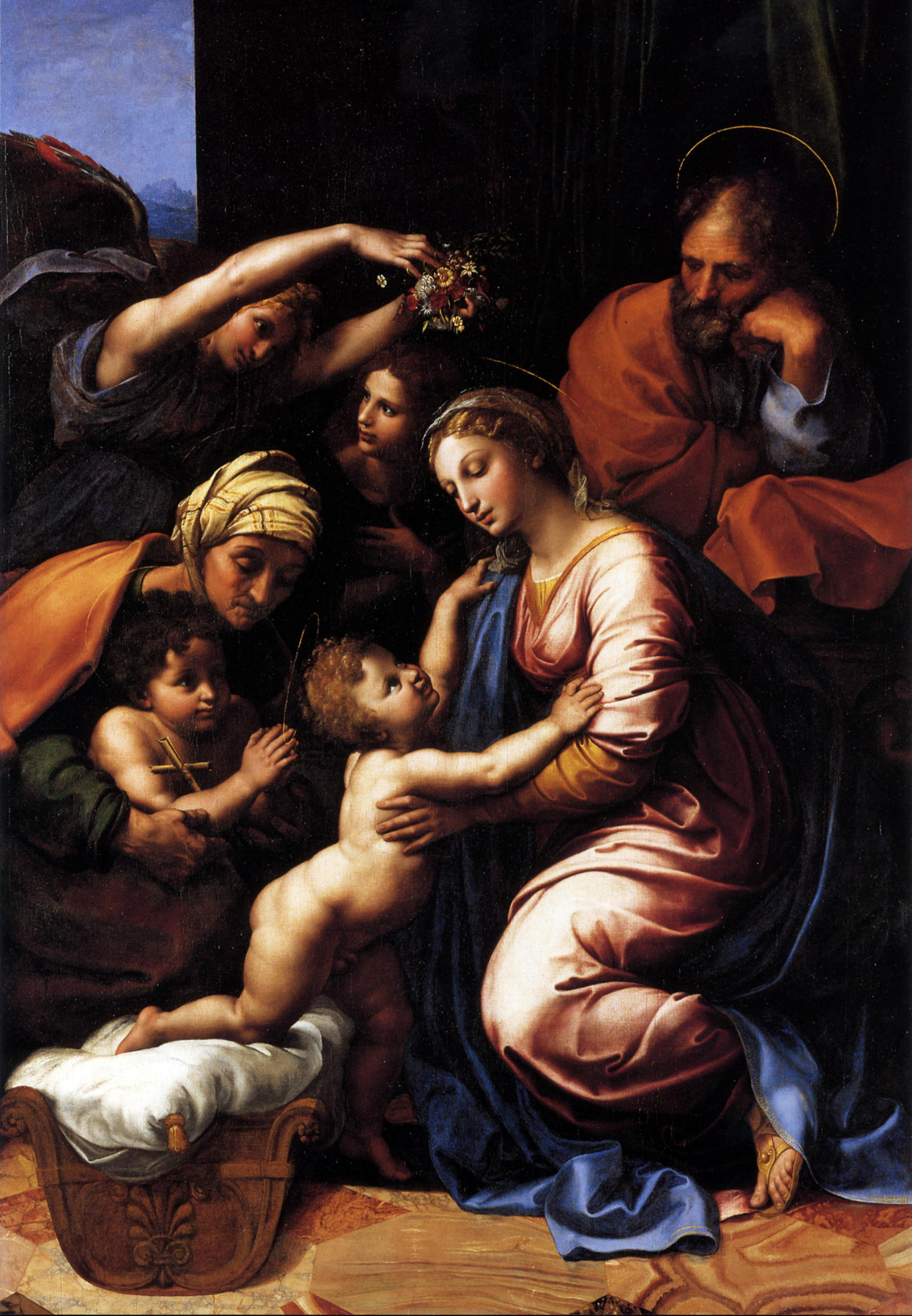
The Holy Family of Francis I, by Raphael (and assistants), 1518

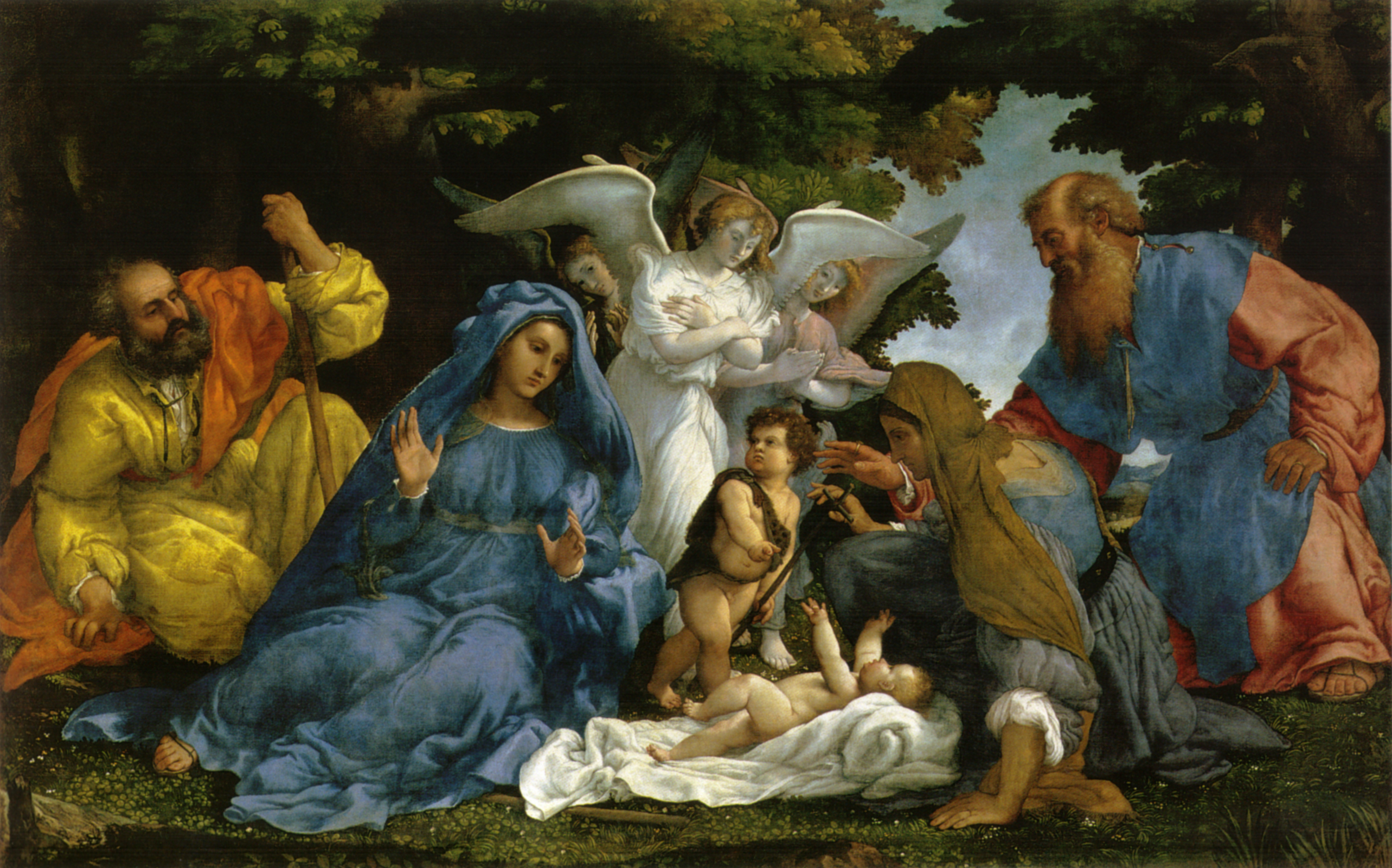
Holy Family with the Family of St John the Baptist, c. 1536, Lorenzo Lotto, Louvre

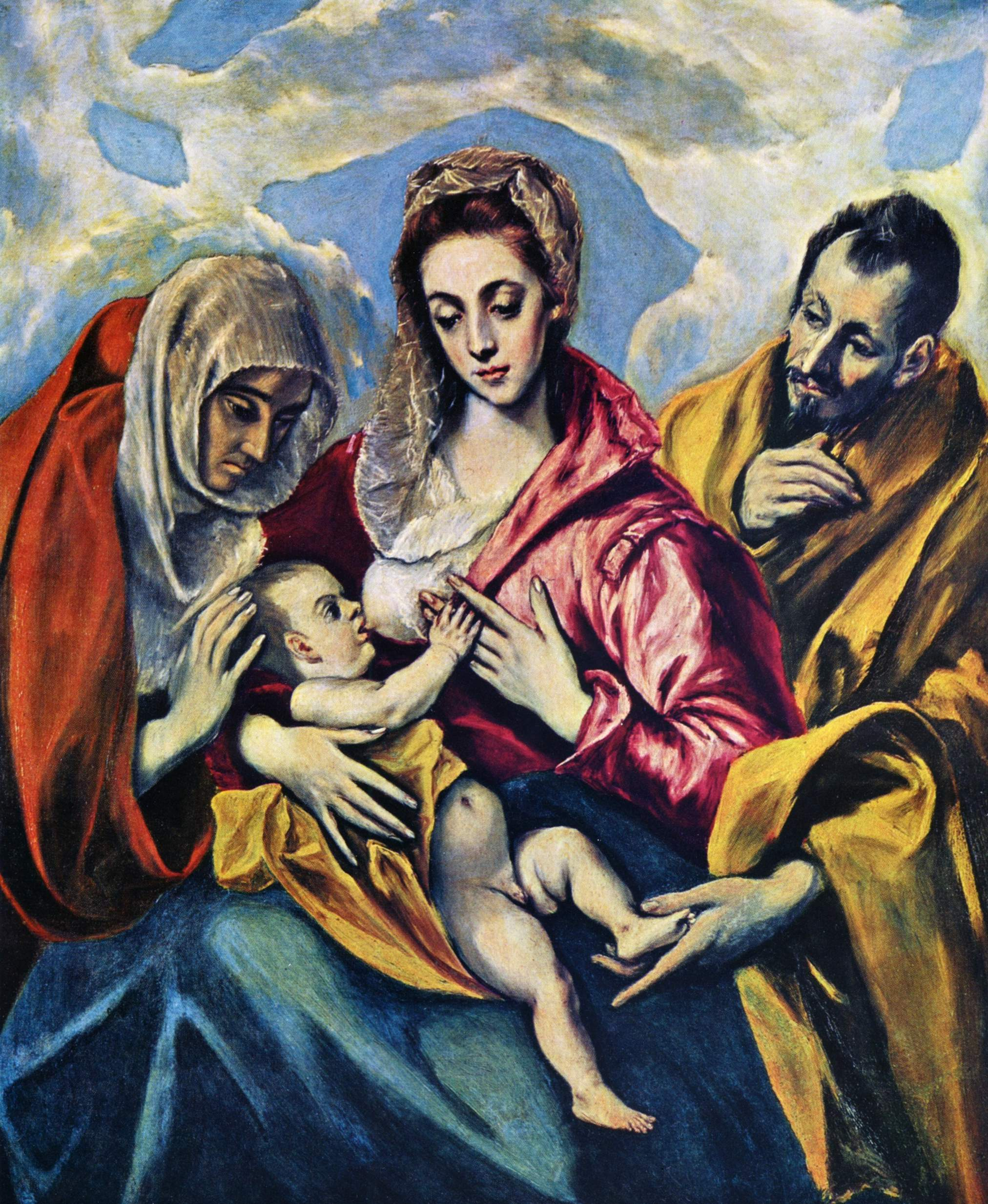
El Greco, 1595, one of a number of versions

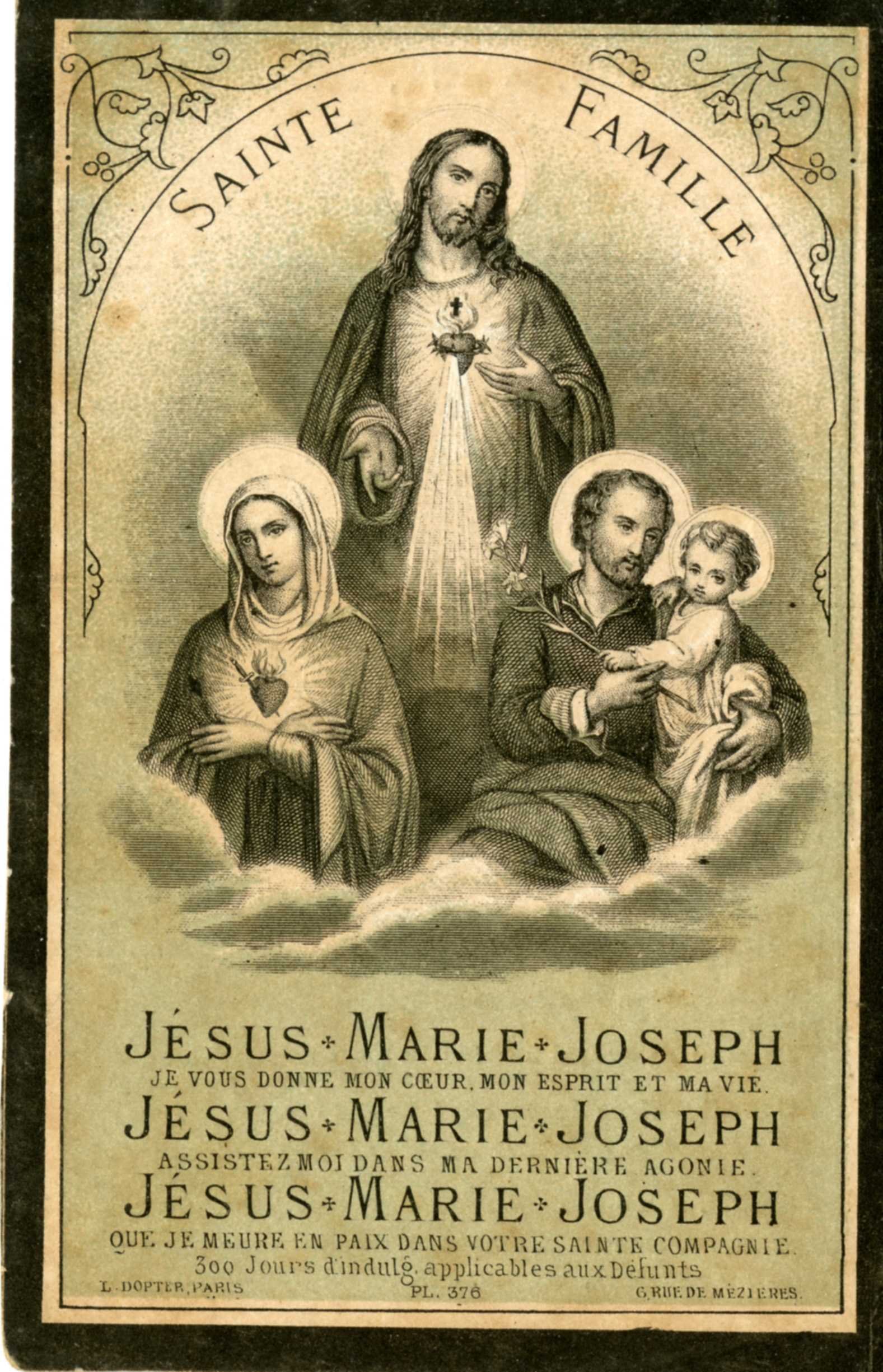
French holy card, 1890

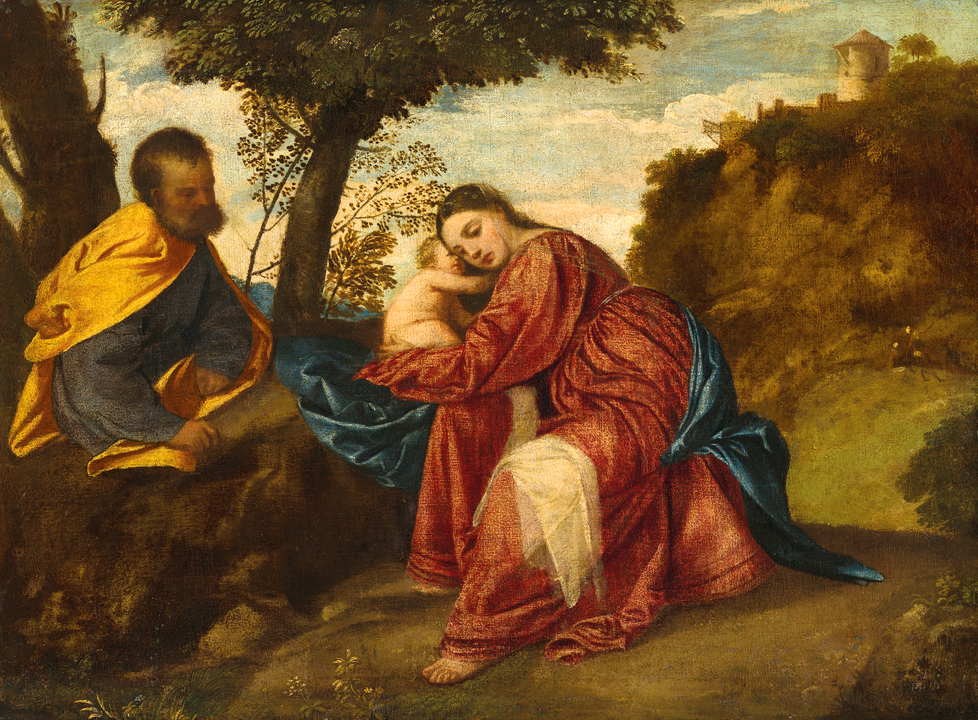
The Rest on the Flight into Egypt

== Patronages and customs ==
The Holy Family of Nazareth is a model of life for the priests and brothers of the Congregation of the Missionaries of the Holy Family. In their pastoral ministry, they emphasize the importance of sincere love and devotion to Jesus, Mary and Joseph. The founder of the congregation, Fr. John Berthier, wrote that "nothing can strengthen faith, hope and embrace hearts with love as the cult of the Holy Family."

The members of the Holy Family are also the patrons of the Congregation of Holy Cross. The Holy Cross Sisters are dedicated to the Immaculate Heart of Mary, the Holy Cross Brothers to Saint Joseph, and the Priests of Holy Cross to the Sacred Heart. The Sons of the Holy Family is another religious congregation devoted to the Holy Family.

The Cathedral of the Holy Family of Nazareth is the see of the Diocese of Tulsa in Oklahoma.

A pious practice among Christians, especially Catholics, is to write "✝ J.M.J. ✝" often flanked by two Christian crosses at the top of letters, cards, documents and personal notes as a reference to Jesus, Mary, and Joseph as the Holy Family. Where it is written, "✝ J.M.J. ✝" is an appeal for the blessing of the Holy Family.

== See also ==
- Category:Paintings of the Holy Family
- Brothers of Jesus
- Chronological list of saints in the 1st century
- Chronology of Jesus
- Finding in the Temple
- Flight into Egypt
- Holy Kinship
- Sisters of the Holy Family of Nazareth
