= Holy Family with the Infant Saint John the Baptist =

Holy Family with the Infant Saint John the Baptist may refer to several paintings:

- Holy Family with the Infant Saint John the Baptist (Beccafumi, Alte Pinakothek)
- Holy Family with the Infant Saint John the Baptist (Beccafumi, Galleria Palatina)
- Holy Family with the Infant Saint John the Baptist (Beccafumi, Uffizi)
- Holy Family with the Infant Saint John the Baptist (Correggio, Los Angeles)
- Holy Family with the Infant Saint John the Baptist (Correggio, Orléans)
- Holy Family with the Infant Saint John the Baptist (Mantegna)
- Holy Family with the Infant Saint John the Baptist (Murillo)
- Holy Family with the Infant Saint John the Baptist (Pontormo)
- Holy Family with the Infant Saint John the Baptist (Parmigianino)
- Holy Family with the Infant Saint John the Baptist (Rosso Fiorentino)

== See also ==
- Holy Family with the Infant John the Baptist and a Donor, by Beccafumi
- Holy Family with the Family of St John the Baptist, by Lorenzo Lotto
