= The Holy Family (Raphael) =

The Holy Family is the subject of many works by Raphael including:

- Holy Family of Francis I, The Louvre, 1518
- Small Holy Family, The Louvre, c. 1516–1518
- Holy Family under an Oak Tree, Museo del Prado, c. 1518, with Giulio Romano
- The Holy Family (La Perla), Museo del Prado, c. 1518

== See also ==
- List of paintings by Raphael
