= Holy Family with Saints Elizabeth and John the Baptist =

Holy Family with Saints Elizabeth and John the Baptist may refer to:

- Holy Family with Saints Elizabeth and John the Baptist (Correggio, Mantua), 1511
- Holy Family with Saints Elizabeth and John the Baptist (Correggio, Pavia), 1510
- The Madonna and Child with Saints Joseph, Elizabeth, and John the Baptist by Andrea Mantegna, c. 1490
