= Small Holy Family =

Painting by Raphael

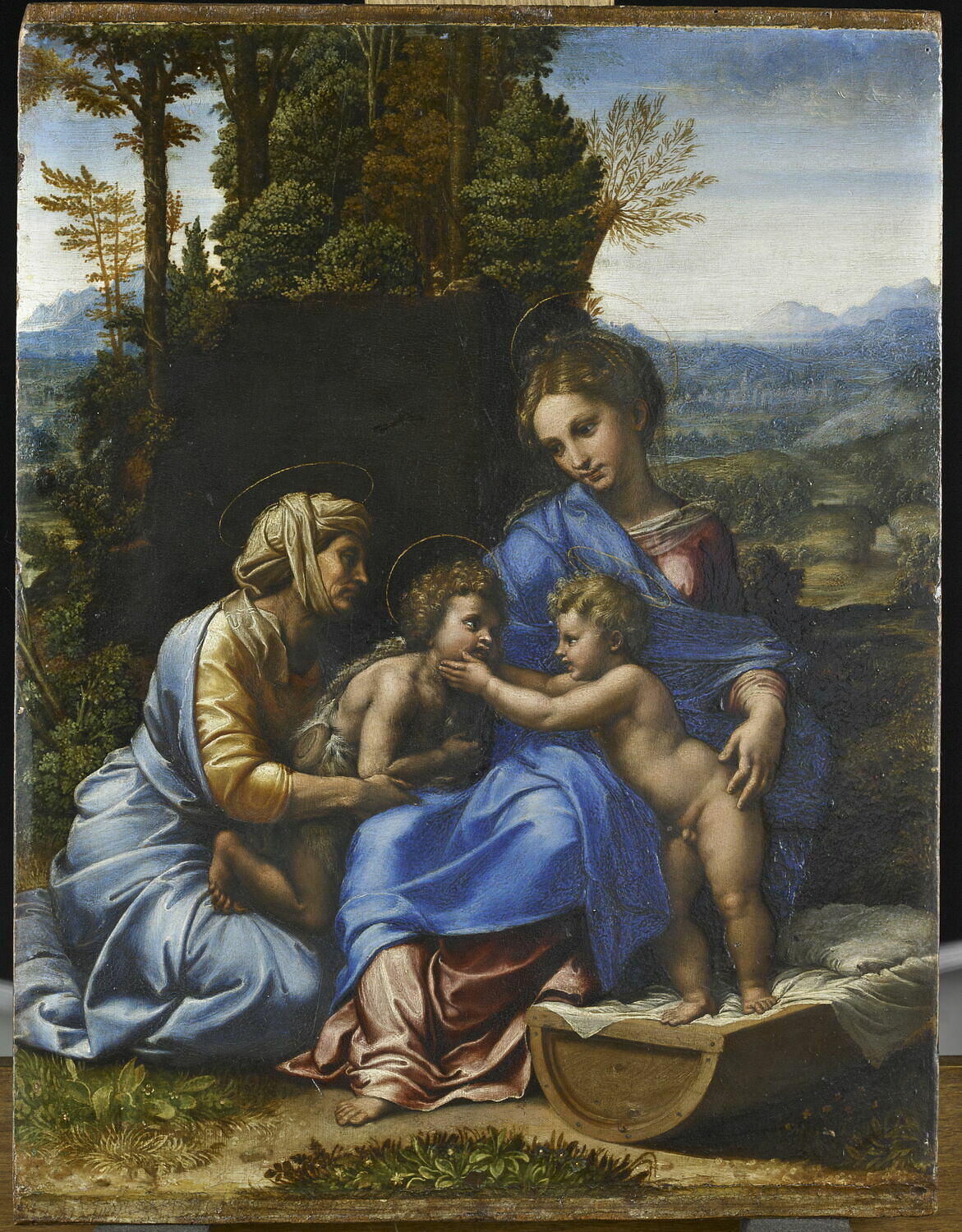
- Artist: Raphael and assistants (Giulio Romano)
- Year: c. 1518–1519
- Medium: oil on panel
- Dimensions: 38 cm × 32 cm (15 in × 13 in)
- Location: Louvre, Paris

The Small Holy Family (c. 1518–1519) is an oil-on-panel painting by Raphael and assistants, now in the Louvre in Paris. Its name distinguishes it from his Great Holy Family, also in the Louvre. It is signed and dated "RAPHAEL VRBINAS S[anti] PINGEBAT MDXVIII" on the hem of the Madonna's garment.

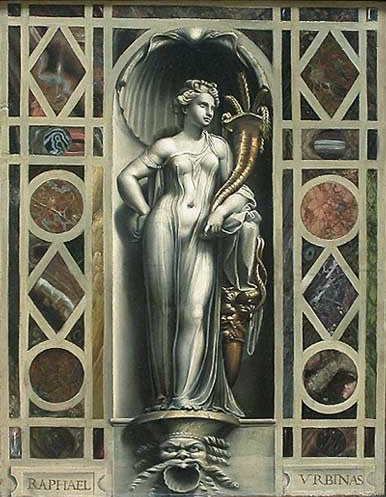
Abundance

According to the 17th century writer André Félibién two further Louvre works Abundance and Ceres, both in monochrome, formed a cover to the Small Holy Family. Abundance has a signature "Raphael Uvrbinas", though this is usually considered a later addition. It may relate to cardinal Bibbiena, whose surname was "Dovizi[a]" (i.e. Abundance). It is a rare survival of a painting for so small a painting. It shows a figure in a niche on a base between marble mirrors, with a mask under the base, referring to an Aphrodite (Kunsthistorisches Museum) originally in the Loggia dei Marmi in the Palazzo Ducale di Mantova.

The work and its cover may have been commissioned from Raphael around 1519 by Pope Leo X as thanks for the services of Adrien Gouffier de Boissy, papal legate to France. de Boissy also owned John the Baptist as a Young Man in the Desert (Louvre), another work by Raphael and assistants, as well as a preparatory drawing for the Small Holy Family now in the Royal Collection at Windsor Castle. In 1622 it was recorded in the collection of the Count of Brienne, who then left it to Louis XIV.

Elizabeth's face and the cradle in the shape of an inverted tree trunk are reminiscent of other works by Raphael from that era such as Holy Family under an Oak Tree (Prado) and La Perla (Prado), both with assistance from Giulio Romano. The background landscape is influenced by the Danubian School.
