= The Holy Family with Saint Jerome =

Painting by Correggio

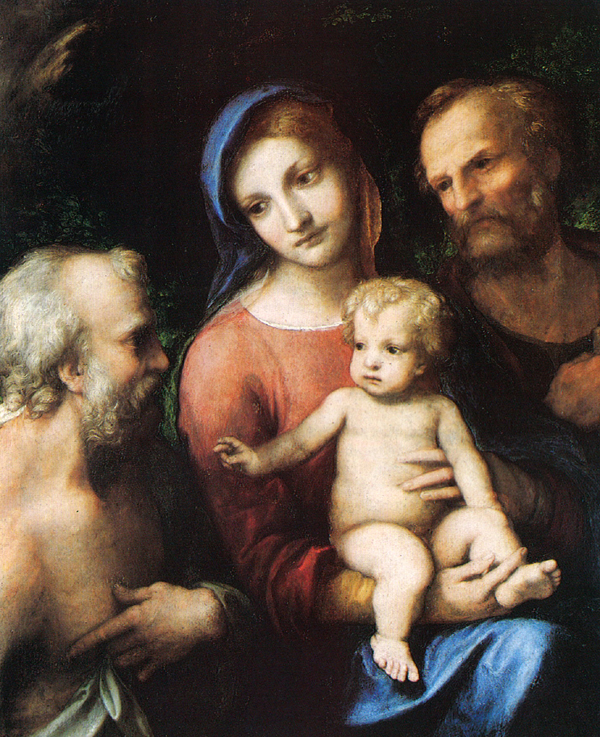
The Holy Family with Saint Jerome

The Holy Family with Saint Jerome is a 68 by 56 cm oil on poplar panel painting by Correggio. It dates to around 1515 and is now displayed in the East Closet of Hampton Court Palace as part of the Royal Collection. It has similarities with the Holy Family with the Infant Saint John the Baptist and so it probably dates to around the time Correggio painted the frescoes in the Camera di San Paolo or possibly slightly earlier. It shows the Holy Family and saint Jerome.

== History ==
It can be identified with the "canvas ... painted with the Madonna with the [Christ] Child in her arms, saint Jerome and saint Joseph, with a carved golden frame 72 V[incenzo]" mentioned on a list of paintings owned by Vincenzo I Gonzaga as of 23 January 1627. It is unknown whether or not it entered the Gonzaga collection thanks to Vincenzo I, but given his interest in Correggio it seems the most plausible hypothesis - he definitely acquired the same artist's Madonna and Child with Saint Francis and the Rest on the Flight into Egypt, for example.

The Flemish art dealer Daniel Nys was tasked by Charles I with acquiring the Gonzaga collection and easily recognised it as a work by Correggio despite its lack of a signature. His correspondence mentions a Madonna by Correggio with the head of St. Joseph which for unknown reasons was one of the works which had not reached Nys at Venice - this seems to be The Holy Family with Saint Jerome. The fact that Nys wrote in 1628 lamenting the work's absence and stating "it must be found" shows the high value he placed on it.

The painting eventually reached Britain and entered Charles' collection - his coat of arms is on its reverse, though it is not mentioned as being by Correggio in the inventory of Charles' collection. It is however referenced as by 'Coregio' in the appraisal of Charles's goods sold by Parliamentarians between 1649 and 1652, as noted by BL Harley MS 4898 (f.90v). The painting was sold to 'Mr Procter' for £58, while appraised at £50. It was re-identified as a work by Correggio in 1870 by Jean Paul Richter and his attribution has been followed by all subsequent art historians.

== Bibliography ==
- (in Italian) Giuseppe Adani, Correggio pittore universale, Silvana Editoriale, Correggio 2007. ISBN 9788836609772
