= Holy Family with the Infant Saint John the Baptist (Beccafumi, Alte Pinakothek) =

Painting by Domenico Beccafumi

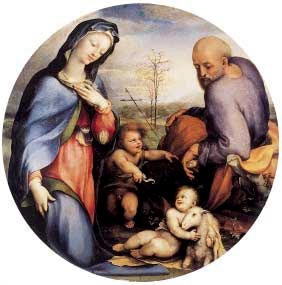
Holy Family with the Infant Saint John the Baptist (c. 1521–1522) by Domenico Beccafumi

Holy Family with the Infant Saint John the Baptist is an oil-on-canvas painting executed c. 1521–1522 by the Italian Renaissance painter Domenico Beccafumi. It is now in the Alte Pinakothek in Munich, which it entered in 1850. It was previously acquired from the casa Marsili in Siena in 1816 for 975 scudi for Prince Ludwig.

The painting depicts the Holy Family together with the Infant John the Baptist. Mary and Joseph form the curved borders of the painting, surrounding baby Jesus and John the Baptist. The Christ Child is most likely the figure embracing the lamb, as a reference to him being the Lamb of God.

Baccheschi dated the work to the years the artist was working for the Marsili by comparison with the San Martino Nativity. Dami agreed, though Adolfo Venturi attributed it to Bacchiacca, possibly confused by a poor photographic reproduction. The attribution to Beccafumi is now universally accepted. Its circular format and balanced composition shows the influence of the late-15th-century and early-16th-century Florentine school, particularly Raphael.
