= Perla di Modena =

Painting attributed to Raphael

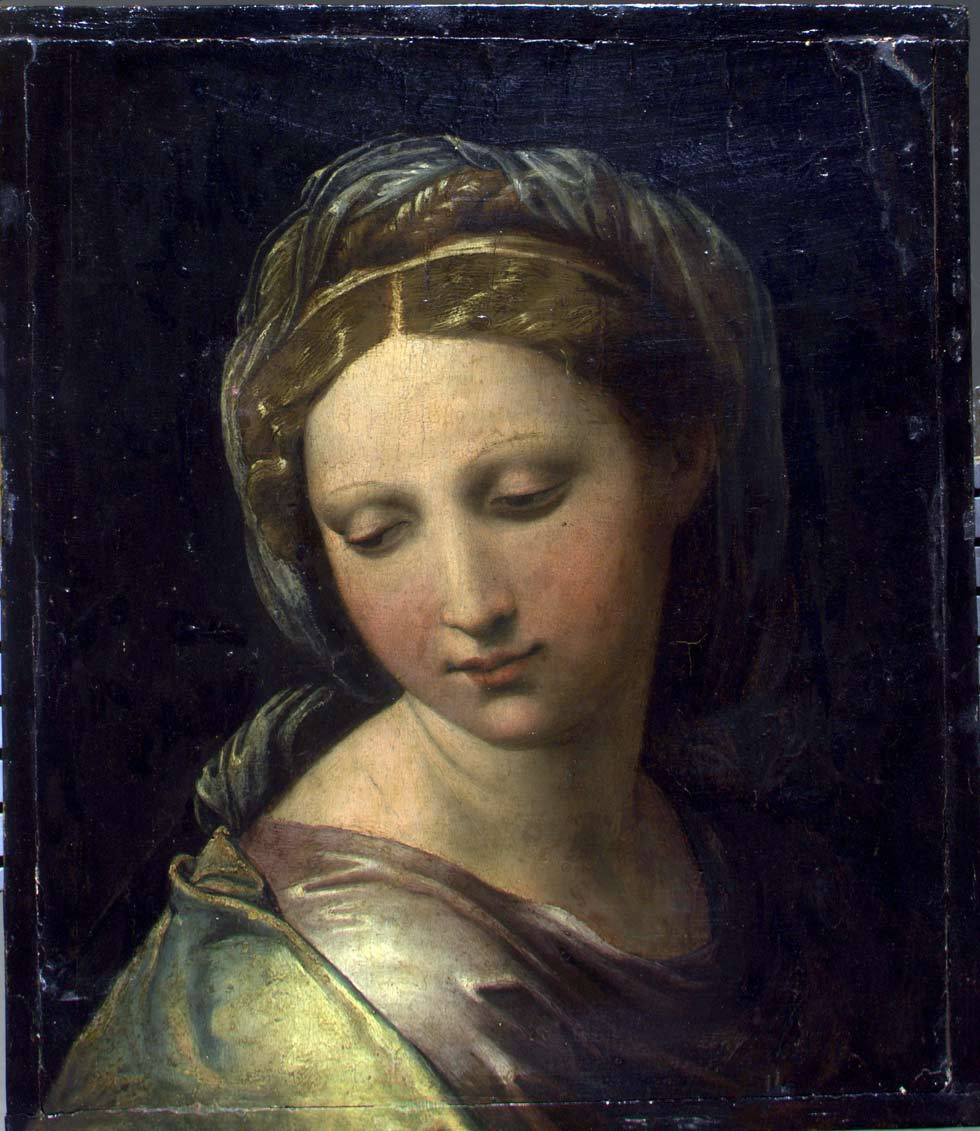
The Perla di Modena

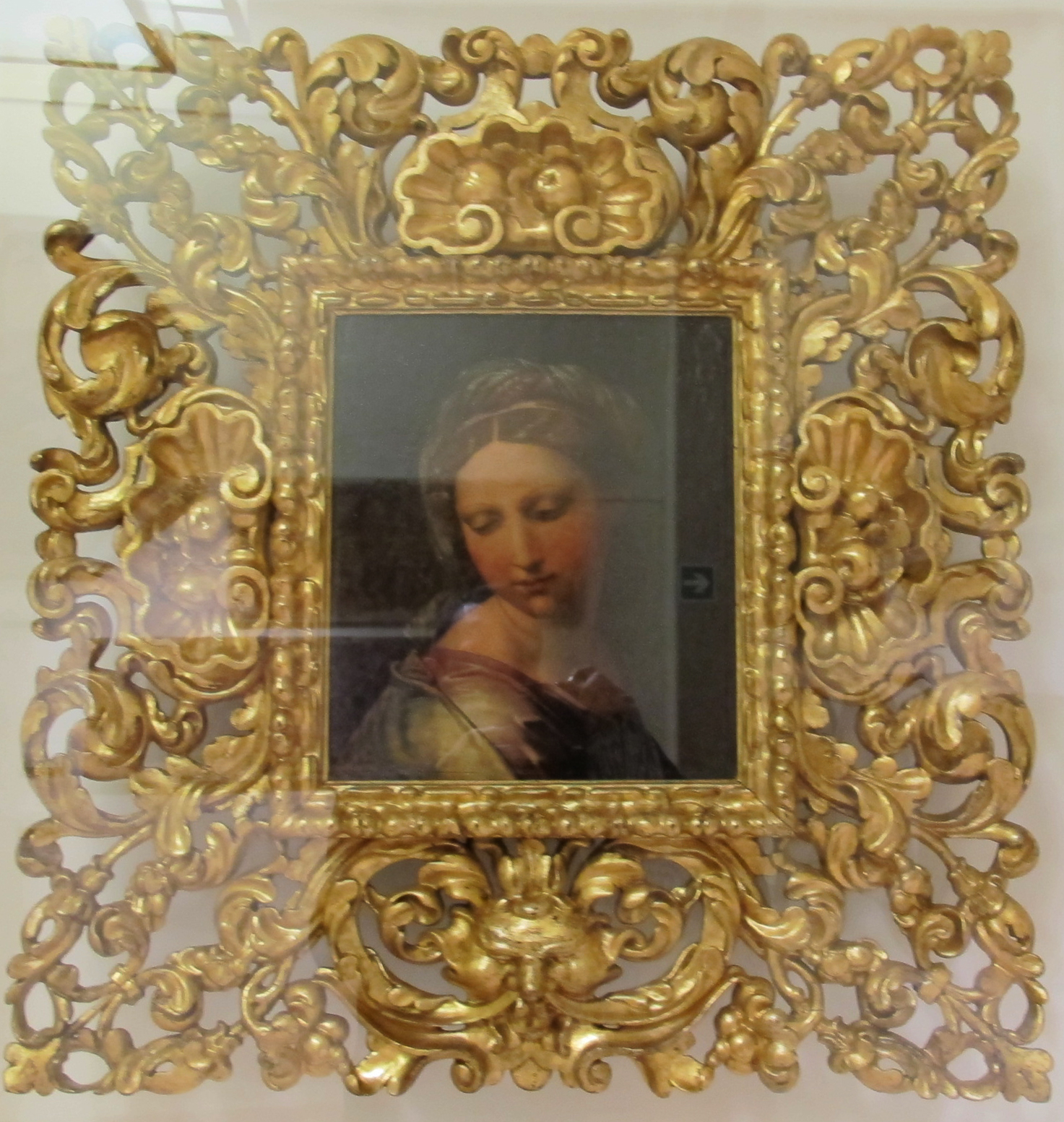
The painting in its frame

The Perla of Modena (literally, the Pearl of Modena) is an oil on panel painting, dated to 1518-1520 and now attributed to Raphael. It is now in the Galleria Estense in Modena.

== History ==
The painting remained in the Galleria's store-rooms for a long time in a very ornate frame topped by an eagle (the d'Este family crest, also seen on the frames of several works from its collection which are now in the Gemäldegalerie Alte Meister in Dresden). It which drew the curiosity of soprintendente Mario Scalini, who decided to send it to the Florentine restorer Lisa Venerosi Pesciolini and to Art-Test Firenze. The restorer studied and scientifically analysed the work, finding a remarkable quality of painting and under-drawing beneath the surface, including a preparatory drawing which supports the theory that the work is by Raphael himself.

It demonstrated the work to be identical with the head of the Virgin from La Perla (now in the Prado), once thought to be a late work by Raphael but now thought to be by Giulio Romano based on drawings by Raphael, but in 2012 during the exhibition "the last Raphael" (Prado) the experts Paul Joannides and Tom Henry came to the conclusion together with the experts from the Prado and the Louvre where the exhibition later settled. to restore the authorship of the work to Raphael.

The identification of the Modena work was based on the eagle on the frame, on the mention of a "woman's head" by Raphael in a 1663 inventory of the d'Este art collections and on the halo behind the head. It probably formed an initial version of La Perla before being abandoned due to flaws in the panel. The work also allows us to see how 17th century painters in Emilia-Romagna referred to this head and to that of Raphael's Saint Cecelia in their elaboration of classicism.

== Bibliography ==
- (in Italian) Pierluigi De Vecchi, Raffaello, Rizzoli, Milano 1975.
- (in Italian) Mario Scalini (ed), La perla di Modena, un Raffaello ritrovato, Silvana Editoriale 2010
