= Holy Family with the Infant Saint John the Baptist (Murillo) =

Painting by Bartolomé Esteban Murillo

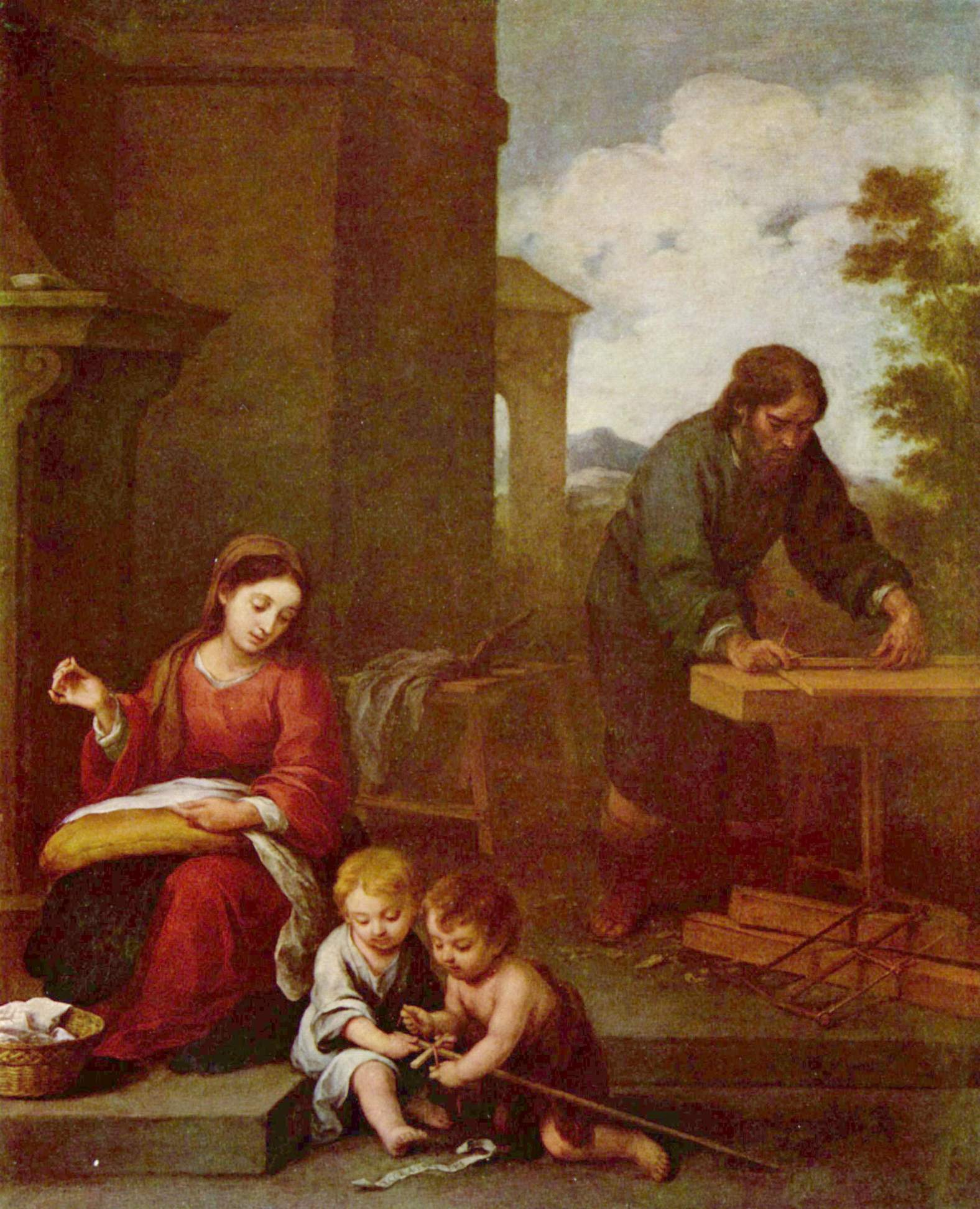
Holy Family with the Infant Saint John the Baptist (c. 1668-1670) by Bartolomé Esteban Murillo

Holy Family with the Infant Saint John the Baptist is an oil on canvas painting by Spanish artist Murillo, created c. 1668-1670, now held in the Museum of Fine Arts in Budapest.
