= Alessandro Fantera =

Italian musician and artist (born 1997)

Alessandro Fantera (born January 10, 1997) is an Italian painter and musician. Born in Voronezh, Russia, he was adopted by an Italian family and grew up in Tivoli. He is based in Bologna. His work combines realist painting techniques with religious and contemporary subjects.

== Early life and education ==
Fantera was born in Voronezh, Russia, and spent his early childhood in several orphanages before being adopted by Italian parents at the age of six. He subsequently grew up in Tivoli, Italy.

He attended an art high school in Tivoli while pursuing musical studies. He studied classical piano and harpsichord at the Luigi Cherubini Conservatory in Florence. During this period, he worked with pianist Francesca Maggini, who introduced him to the painter Silvestro Pistolesi, a former pupil of Pietro Annigoni.

Under Pistolesi's guidance, Fantera began studying realist painting. During this period he produced Peccato numero 8 ("Sin Number 8"), one of his early works.

== Artistic development ==
Alongside his musical studies, Fantera studied the techniques of earlier painters through copies of works including Martha and Mary Magdalene by Caravaggio, Madonna of the Chair by Raphael, The Kiss by Francesco Hayez, Sunflowers by Vincent van Gogh and paintings from Claude Monet's Poppies series. This practice contributed to his interest in figurative painting and realist techniques.

== Bologna and religious works ==
Fantera moved to Bologna in October 2022. Following a meeting with Cardinal Matteo Zuppi, he began working on a religious painting connected with the Basilica of San Petronio.

After a series of studies on religious subjects conducted with writer Francesco Lisbona, Fantera produced an oil painting measuring 180 × 130 cm. The work was painted inside the Basilica of San Petronio, in the Chapel of Saint Barbara.

In September 2024, Peccato numero 8 was exhibited in the Chapel of Saint Bridget at the Basilica of San Petronio during the event "Memorare '24: Dance and Song for Peace". The exhibition was organised following an invitation from Vittoria Cappelli.

On October 4, 2024, during the patronal feast of Saint Petronius, Fantera exhibited San Petronio and the Angel in the Basilica of San Petronio. The work remained on display for approximately one month and was subsequently transferred to the Archdiocese of Bologna.

== The Exiled Family ==
Following his exhibitions in Bologna, Fantera developed a project for the 2025 Jubilee in collaboration with Francesco Lisbona, art critic Milena Naldi and architect Pierluigi Cervellati.

The project was accepted by the Dicastery for Promoting Integral Human Development. The resulting work, The Exiled Family (La Famiglia Esule), is an oil on canvas depicting a moment from the Holy Family's Flight into Egypt. The painting incorporates contemporary references to displacement and conflict.

The Exiled Family was presented on January 16, 2026, at Palazzo San Callisto in Rome, the headquarters of the Dicastery for Promoting Integral Human Development.

== Latest work ==
Fantera's latest work is The Veil of Time. It will be presented on June 10, 2026, at Palazzo Medici Riccardi (Florence), in the Luca Giordano Hall, during the ceremony of the Gradiva International Poetry Prize.

== Style and themes ==
Fantera's work is primarily associated with figurative and realist painting. His production includes religious subjects as well as works addressing contemporary social themes. His paintings frequently employ traditional techniques and compositional models while placing sacred subjects in relation to contemporary contexts.
