= Parte Guelfa Holy Family =

C. 1490 painting by Luca Signorelli

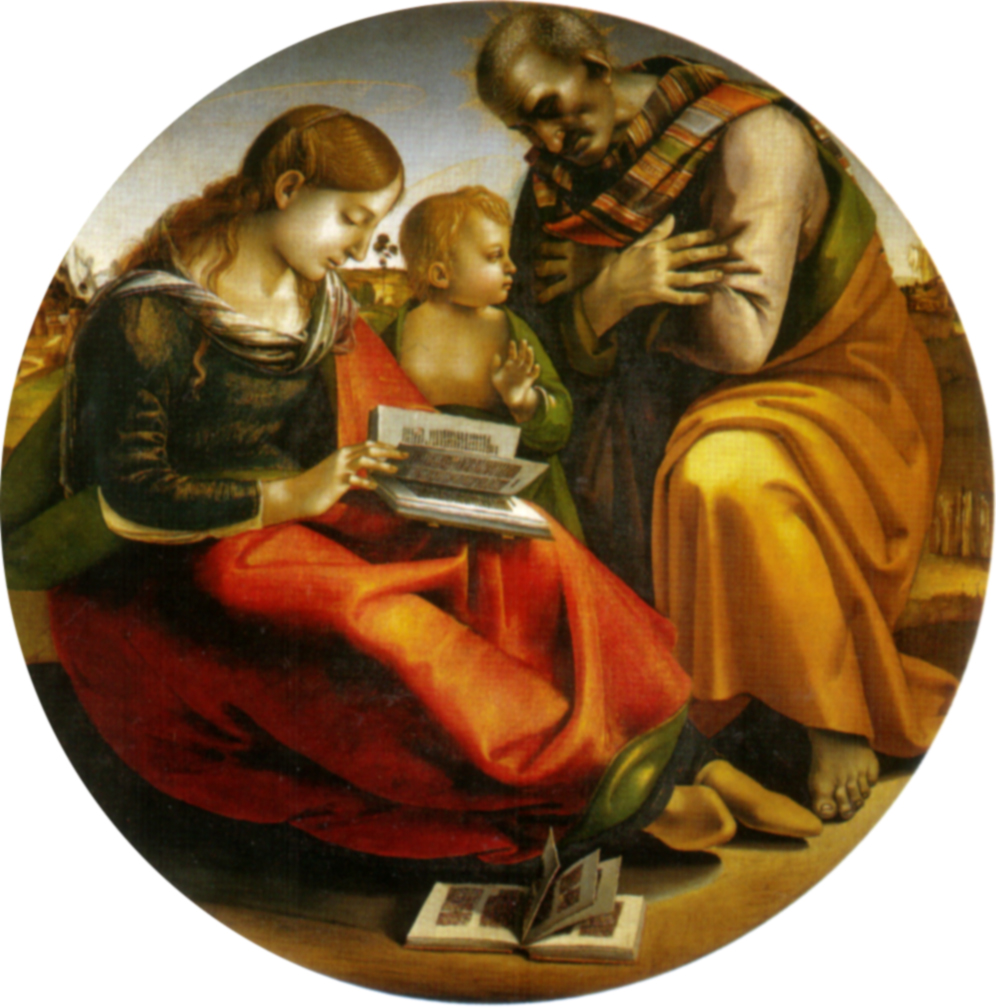
Parte Guelfa Holy Family (c. 1490) by Luca Signorelli

The Parte Guelfa Holy Family (Italian - Sacra Famiglia di Parte Guelfa) is a tempera on panel painting by Luca Signorelli, created c. 1490, now in the Uffizi in Florence.

It is named after the Palazzo di Parte Guelfa in Florence, for which it was painted. It has 124 cm in diameter and it was one of the artist's first tondo treatments of the Holy Family or Madonna and Child. Mentioned in Vasari's Lives of the Artists, it remained in the Camera della Comunità (also known as the Sala delle Udienze) until 27 January 1802 when it was moved to the Uffizi, although authorisation had been given for the move two years earlier.
