= The Madonna and Child with Saints Joseph, Elizabeth, and John the Baptist =

Painting by Andrea Mantegna

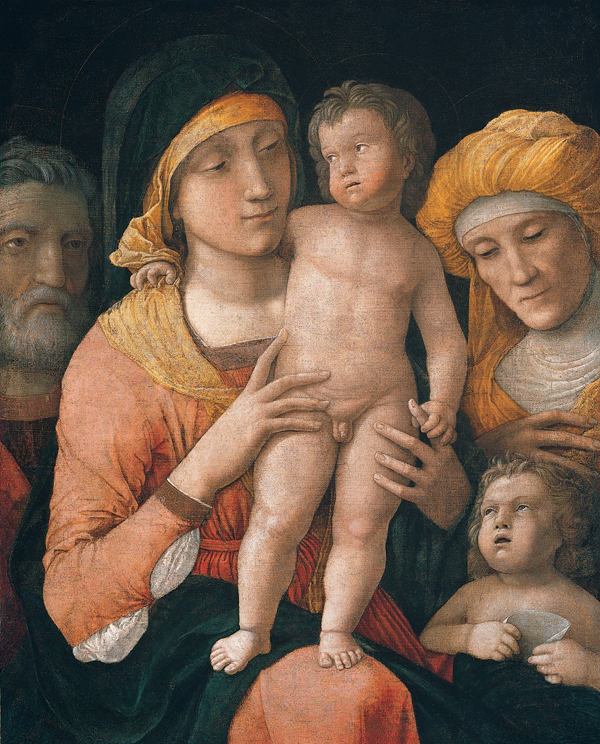
- Artist: Andrea Mantegna
- Year: 1490
- Medium: glue tempera and gold on canvas
- Dimensions: 62.9 cm × 51.3 cm (24.8 in × 20.2 in)
- Location: Kimbell Art Museum, Fort Worth

The Madonna and Child with Saints Joseph, Elizabeth, and John the Baptist is a glue-tempera painting on canvas, with gilded highlights and measuring 62.9 cm by 51.3 cm. It was painted around 1490 by Andrea Mantegna and is now in the Kimbell Art Museum in Fort Worth, Texas.

Mantegna bases the frontal contrapposto pose of the Christ Child on classical models such as the young Dionysius which he would have seen in the Gonzaga collection. He is balanced on the Virgin's knee, with Joseph to her left and saint Elisabeth (identical to the Elisabeth in the Madonna della Vittoria) with her son John the Baptist to the right. The work was probably intended for private devotional use.

== History ==
Mantegna's use of canvas for the work as well as its stylistic similarities to the Trivulzio Madonna date it to his later period. It left Italy in the mid-19th century and by 1909 was in a private collection in Marseille. Sotheby's auctioned it in Monaco on 21 June 1986, selling it to a European private collection, from which it was acquired by its current owners on the New York market in 1987.
