= The Exiled Family =

Painting about the Holy Family's Flight into Egypt

The exiled family
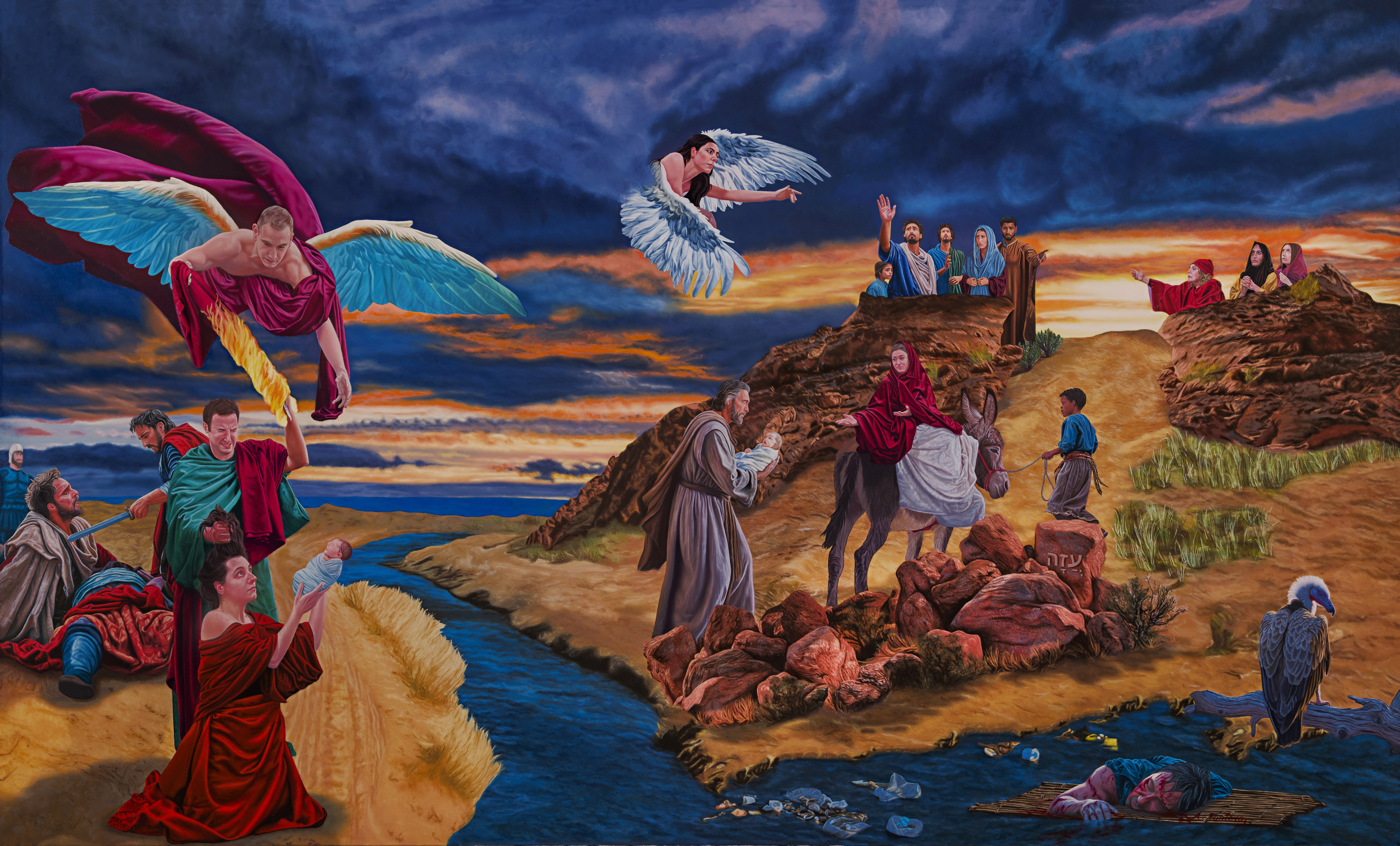
- Artist: Alessandro Fantera
- Medium: Oil on canvas
- Subject: Holy family
- Dimensions: 200cm x120cm
- Location: Palazzo San Callisto, Vatican city

The Exiled Family (Italian: La Famiglia Esule) is an oil on canvas painting (200 × 120 cm) by Italian artist Alessandro Fantera. The work was created for the Dicastery for Promoting Integral Human Development and was presented on January 16 at the conclusion of the Holy Year in a ceremony held at Palazzo San Callisto in Rome.The presentation was attended by Michael Czerny, Prefect of the Dicastery, Monsignor Jozef Barlaš and Fabio Baggio, Undersecretaries of the same Dicastery.

== Background ==
The painting depicts a moment of the Holy Family's Flight into Egypt, symbolically setting it within the context of the Gaza Strip. Fantera previously produced religious works including San Petronio and the Angel, exhibited at the Basilica of San Petronio in Bologna on October 4, 2024, during the patronal feast Mass

== Description ==
The scene is structured around a choral composition. The palette alternates warm, earthy tones with deep blues in the sky.
