= Holy Family with the Infant Saint John the Baptist (Beccafumi, Galleria Palatina) =

Painting by Domenico Beccafumi

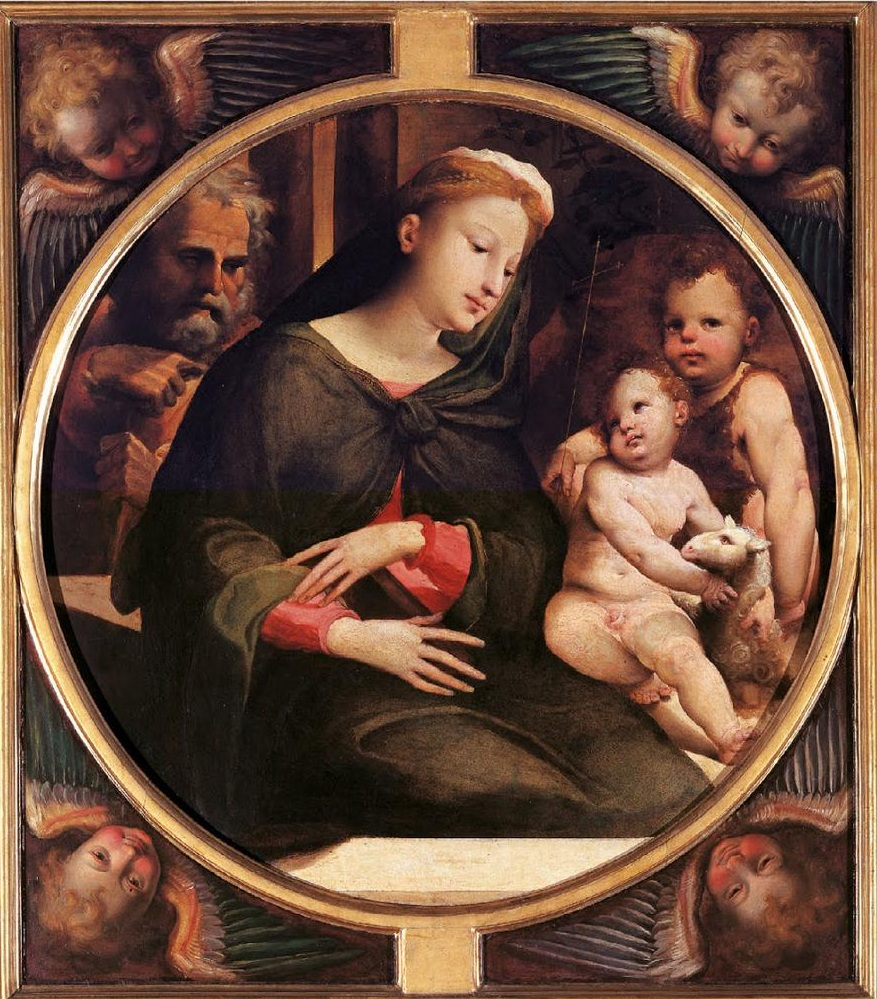
Holy Family with the Infant Saint John the Baptist (c. 1521–1522) by Domenico Beccafumi

Holy Family with the Infant Saint John the Baptist is an oil-on-canvas painting by the Italian Renaissance painter Domenico Beccafumi, executed c. 1521–1522, now in the Galleria Palatina in Florence. The painting's composition is strongly influenced by Raphael. The seraphim in the four corners of the work are thought to be later additions by a Sienese artist, possibly at the end of the 16th century – Judey attributes them to an artist in the circle of Correggio and Sanminiatelli to a generic Baroque-influenced Sienese artist.

It is unclear when the painting entered the Medici collections, since their inventories record two almost identically sized tondi by Beccafumi with angels' heads, the first in the Tribuna of the Uffizi (ins. 71, c. 30) and the other in the casino di San Marco (Guardaroba Medicea 136, c. 154v.). As it shows Joseph, it is probably the first which is the work now in the Galleria Palatina. Baccheschi dated the work by comparison with the San Martino Nativity.
