= Holy Family with Saints Elizabeth and John the Baptist (Correggio, Mantua) =

Painting by Antonio da Correggio

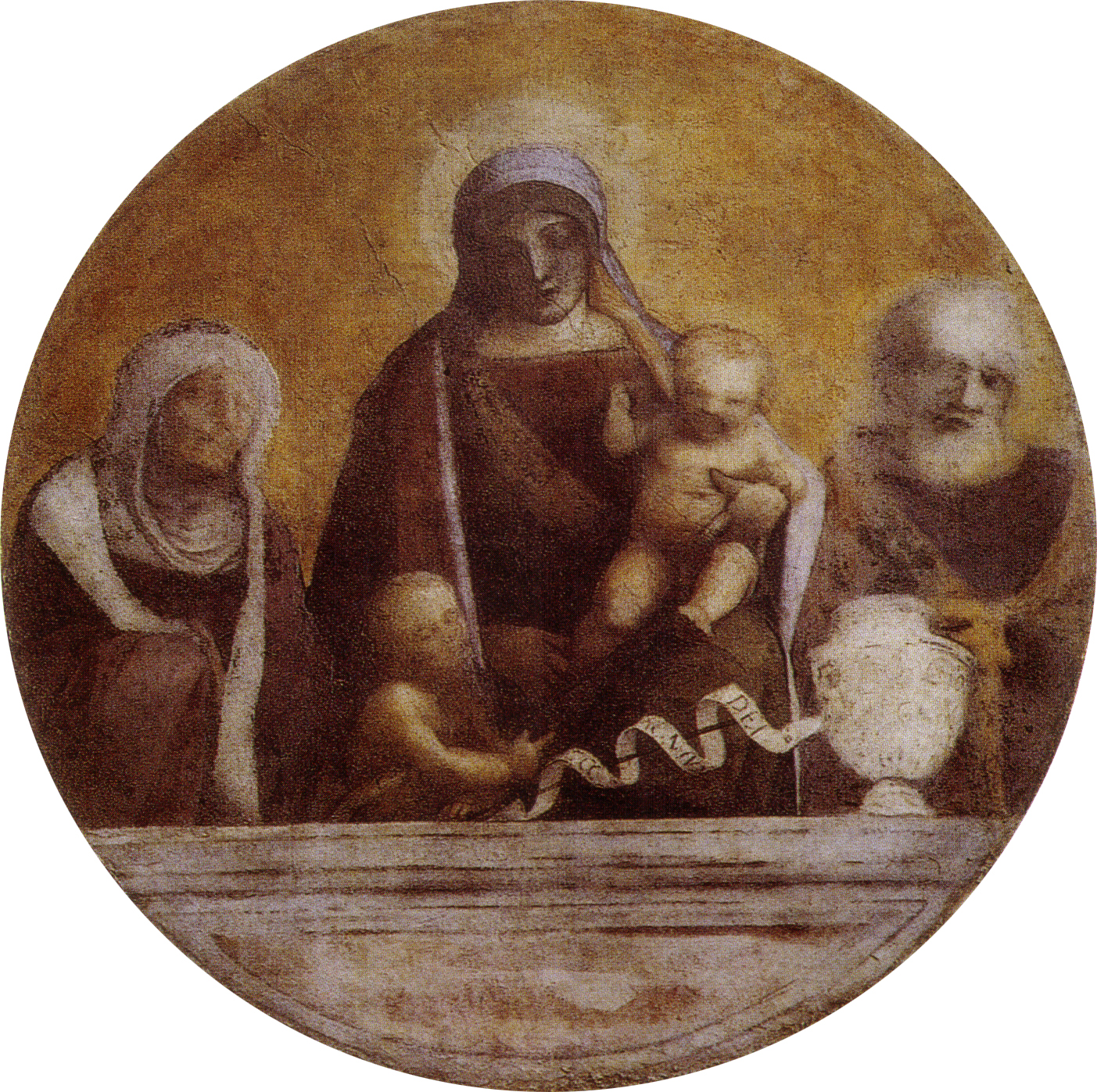
Holy Family

Holy Family with Saints Elizabeth and John the Baptist is a fragment of a fresco from the Basilica of Sant'Andrea, Mantua, now held in Mantua's Diocesan Museum. It was painted c. 1509–1511 by the Italian Renaissance painter Correggio and is 1.5m in diameter. It shows the Virgin Mary, the Christ Child, St Joseph (right), St Elizabeth (left) and the infant John the Baptist (centre, holding a banner inscribed Ecce Agnus Dei).

== History ==
Four large tondi were commissioned from Mantegna for the basilica church just before he left for Rome, where he spent two years in the service of Pope Innocent VIII. They may have been begun by his studio, meaning that one of them might have been begun in 1488 but only completed twenty years later by a young Correggio, who had worked on the Mantegna funerary chapel. All four tondi were detached and restored in 1961. The experts examining them attributed only one (The Ascension) to Mantegna himself, and even in that case he may have only contributed the preparatory drawing.
