= Holy Family with the Family of St John the Baptist =

c. 1536 painting by Lorenzo Lotto

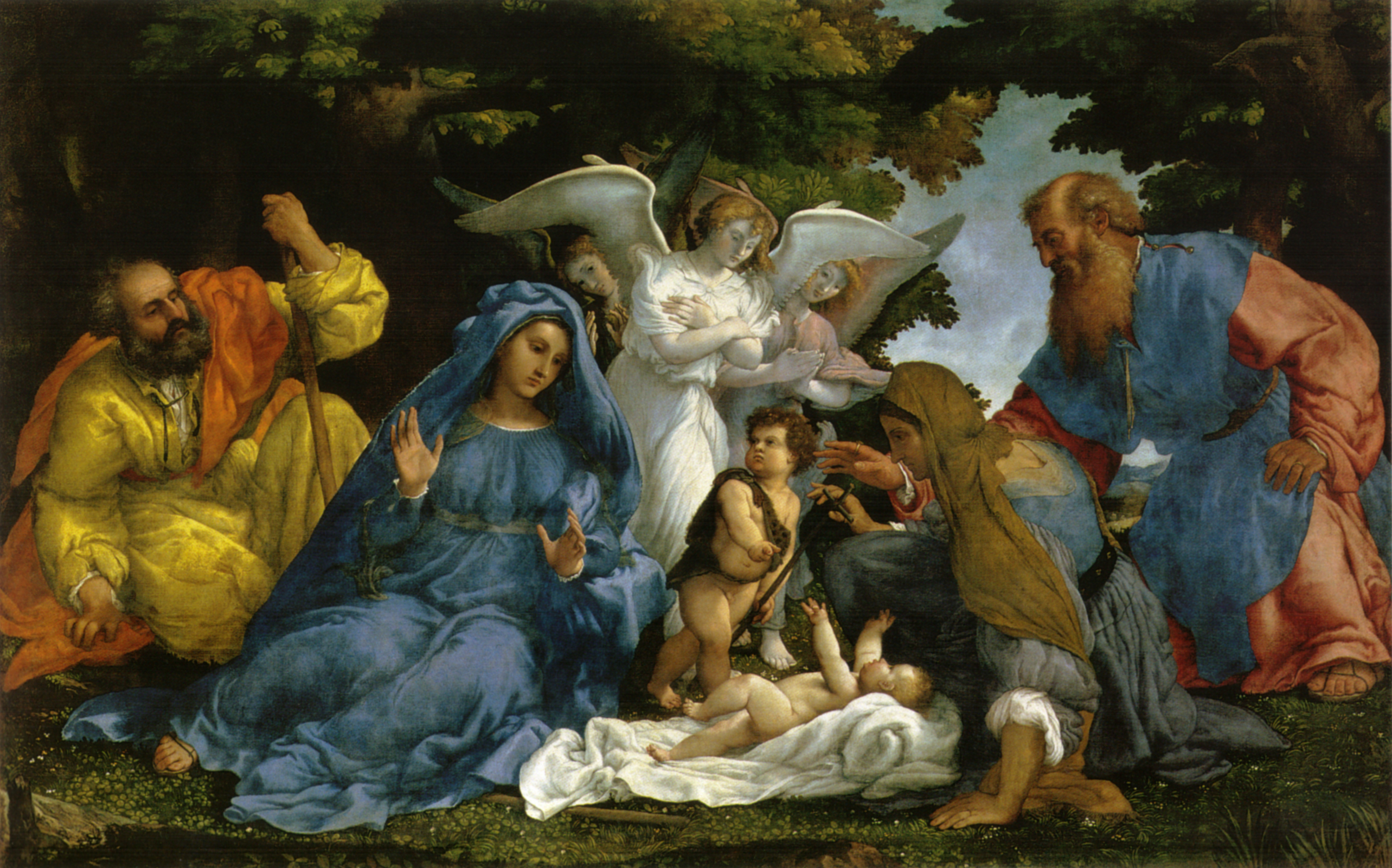
Holy Family with the Family of St John the Baptist (c. 1536) by Lorenzo Lotto

Holy Family with the Family of St John the Baptist is an oil-on-canvas painting created c. 1536 by the Italian artist Lorenzo Lotto, and now in the Louvre in Paris. It was probably produced as a private commission, possibly for a Venetian. However, for unknown reasons it remained with the artist, who tried to sell it on before leaving for the Marche in 1549, as recorded in a note in his commonplace books. He sought to use his friend Jacopo Sansovino as his go-between for the work, but Sansovino ended up unable to sell this or any other works by Lotto and returned them all to the painter.

Lotto tried to sell them off again in 1550, by which time he was in Ancona, this time at a public auction in the Loggia dei Mercanti. This too proved unsuccessful, with Holy Family and most of the other works again remaining unsold. The artist probably took the work to Loreto, where he made a copy of it for the Palazzo Apostolico. The original work passed out of his hands later, possibly via the religious community of Oblates of the Holy House, of which he had become a member. It reappeared in 1662 in an inventory of the French royal collections, having been acquired by an art dealer with a misattribution to Dosso Dossi.
