= San Martino Nativity =

Painting by Domenico Beccafumi

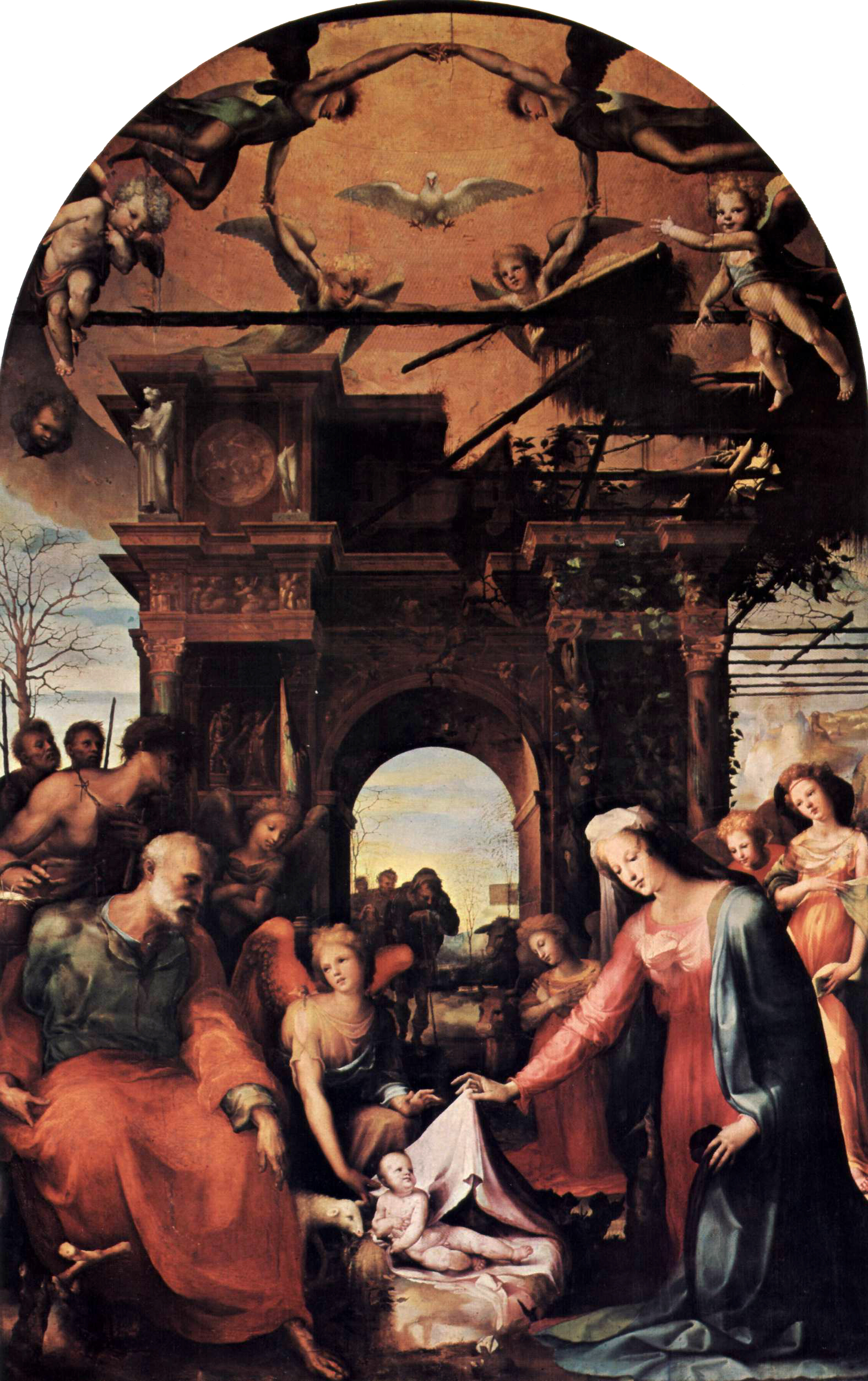
San Martino Nativity (c. 1524) by Domenico Beccafumi

The San Martino Nativity is an oil painting on canvas executed c. 1524 by the Italian Renaissance painter Domenico Beccafumi. It is named after the church of San Martino in Siena, where it still hangs over the altar in the funerary chapel of its commissioner Anastasia Marisli, who died in 1524.

Vasari mentions it in his Lives of the Artists, as does Della Valle, with the latter mentioning a sketch for it in the casa Magnoni. A preparatory drawing for it survives in the Uffizi's Gabinetto dei Disegni e delle Stampe. It is influenced by the works produced in Tuscany and Rome by Raphael, with the angelic choir a direct reference to his Madonna of the Baldacchino, whilst the triumphal arch in the background (symbolising the fall of the pagan world) draws on Francesco di Giorgio's San Domenico Nativity and on the Arch of Constantine.
