= Holy Family of Francis I =

Painting by Raphael

The Holy Family of Francis I
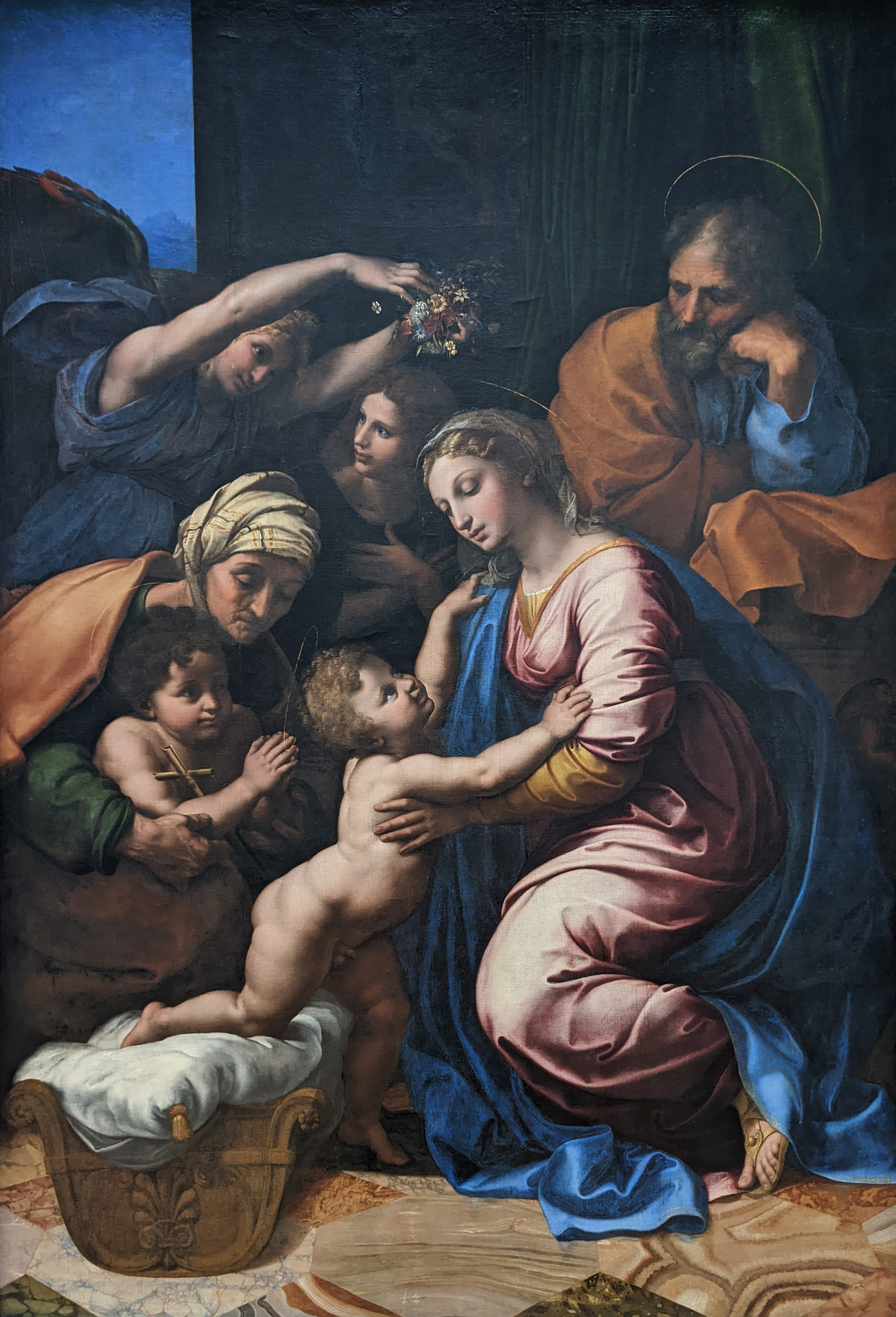
- Artist: Workshop of Raphael
- Year: 1518
- Type: Oil on canvas transferred from wood
- Dimensions: 207 cm × 140 cm (81 in × 55 in)
- Location: Louvre, Paris

The Holy Family is a 1518 painting of the Holy Family (Jesus, Mary and Joseph), Saint Elisabeth, an infant John the Baptist and two angels. It is signed by Raphael, but most of the work was delegated to his workshop assistants. It was commissioned by Pope Leo X as a gift to Claude, wife of Francis I of France, hence its name. It is now in the Louvre.

== See also ==
- List of paintings by Raphael
