= Holy Family with the Infant Saint John the Baptist (Correggio, Orléans) =

Painting by Antonio da Correggio

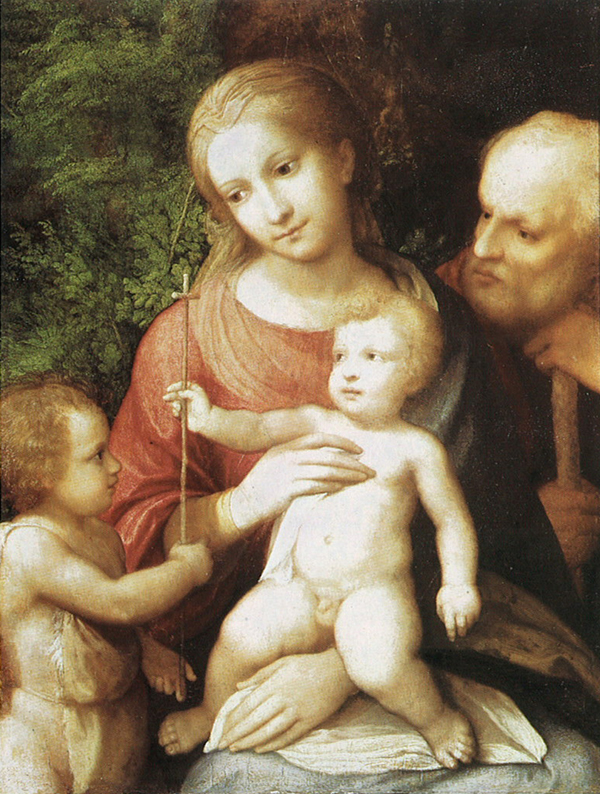
Holy Family

Holy Family with the Infant Saint John the Baptist is an oil on panel painting measuring 63 by 53 cm, dating to around 1518 and painted by Correggio and now held in the Musée des Beaux-Arts d'Orléans.

== History ==
The coat of arms of Charles I of England on the painting's reverse shows it was in his collection, though its first secure mention in a collection inventory is during its time in the collection of Louis XIV of France, where it was described by Charles le Brun in 1693 as a work "in the manner of Correggio". It was still in Versailles in 1695 when it was catalogued again and it also appears in the 1709-1710 lists by Bailly as a work "thought to be by Correggio". A new inventory in 1754 by Lépicié re-attributed it as definitely a work by Correggio, but throughout the 19th century it was held to be a work by "an anonymous artist of the Lombard School", even when it was moved to Orléans late in that century. In 1921 it was re-attributed back to Correggio by Roberto Longhi, who placed it immediately before his design of the Camera di San Paolo and noted its similarities to the artist's Holy Family with Saint Jerome.
