= Holy Family under an Oak Tree =

Painting by Raphael

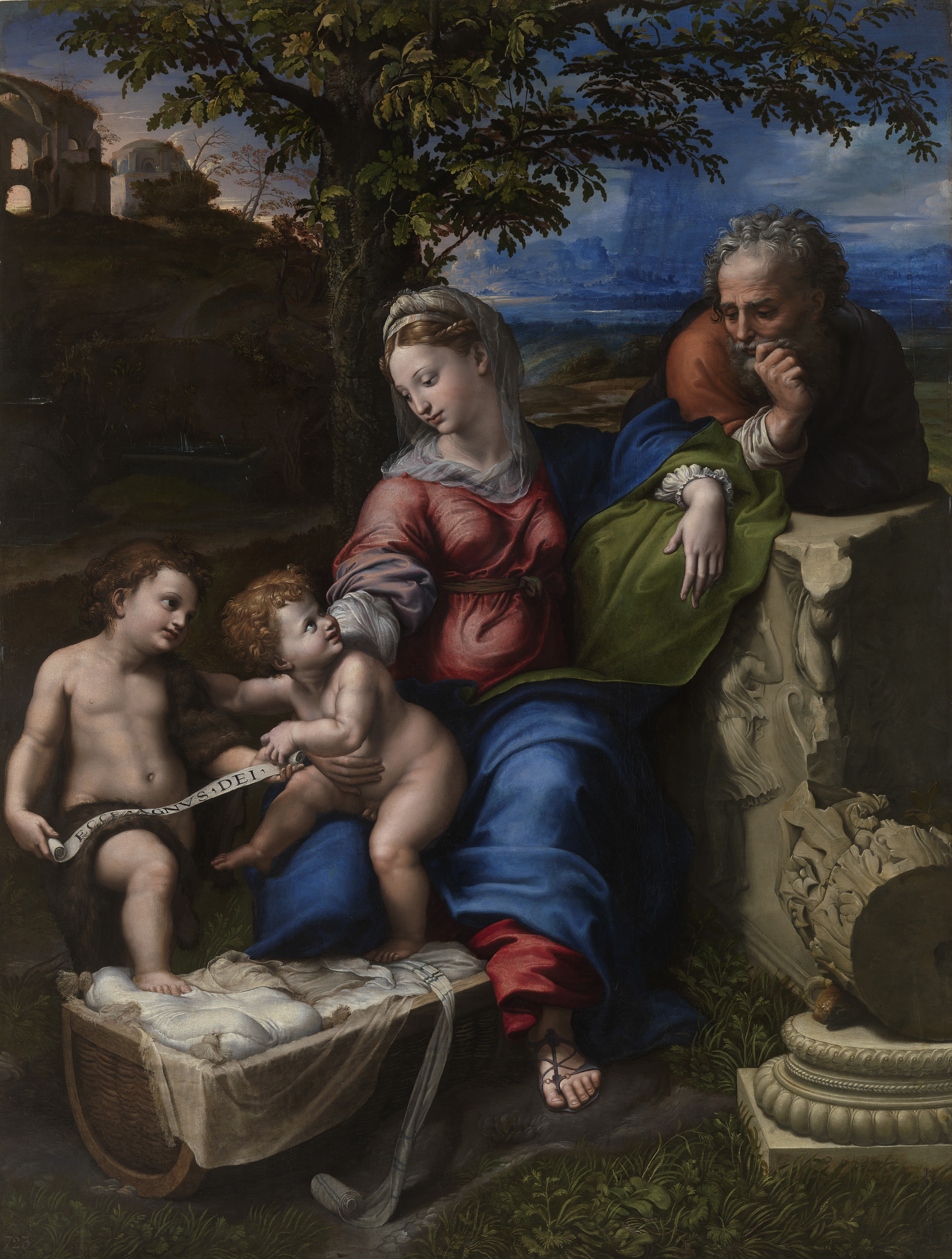
Holy Family under an Oak Tree (c. 1518) by Giulio Romano

Holy Family under an Oak Tree or Madonna of the Oak Tree is an oil-on-panel painting by the Italian Renaissance artist Giulio Romano using a composition or underdrawing by Raphael. It is now in the Prado in Madrid. It is dated to c. 1518 by its stylistic similarities to other works produced by the two artists around that time such as La Perla (Prado). In the background is a valley reminiscent of that of the River Tiber, with a ruin on a hill to the left based on the Basilica of Maxentius or the Baths of Caracalla.

Its popularity is demonstrated by the large number of surviving copies, for example in Pesaro, Bologna, the Hermitage Museum, the Royal Collection at Hampton Court Palace and the Hague. Another at the Galleria Palatina in Florence is known as Madonna of the Lizard (Madonna della Lucertola) after the addition of a lizard on the column fragment in the right foreground and is attributed to Girolamo Siciolante da Sermoneta.

== See also ==
- List of paintings by Raphael
