= Holy Family with the Infant Saint John the Baptist (Correggio, Los Angeles) =

Painting attributed to Antonio da Correggio

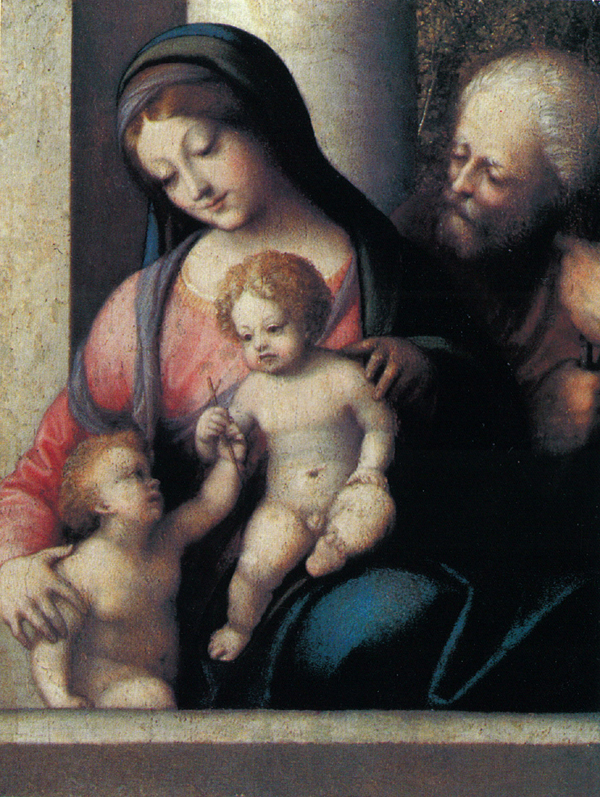
Holy Family

Holy Family with the Infant Saint John the Baptist is a small (26.5 cm by 21 cm) oil on canvas painting, attributed to Correggio and dating to around 1514. It is now in the Los Angeles County Museum of Art, where it has been since 1946.

== History ==
It first became known to critics early in the 20th century and was lent to the Fogg Art Museum in 1905 or 1906, where it was seen and studied by Bernard Berenson, who published his work on it in 1907. His attribution of it to Correggio was supported by Adolfo Venturi and then in the 1970s by Arturo Carlo Quintavalle and Cecil Gould. David Alan Brown disagreed, thinking it an exercise in imitation of Correggio by Francesco Maria Rondani, a painter from Parma. In more recent years David Ekserdjian has doubted the attribution to Correggio, though it has been supported by Mario Di Giampaolo and Andrea Muzzi.
