= Holy Family with the Infant Saint John the Baptist (Beccafumi, Uffizi) =

Painting by Domenico di Pace Beccafumi

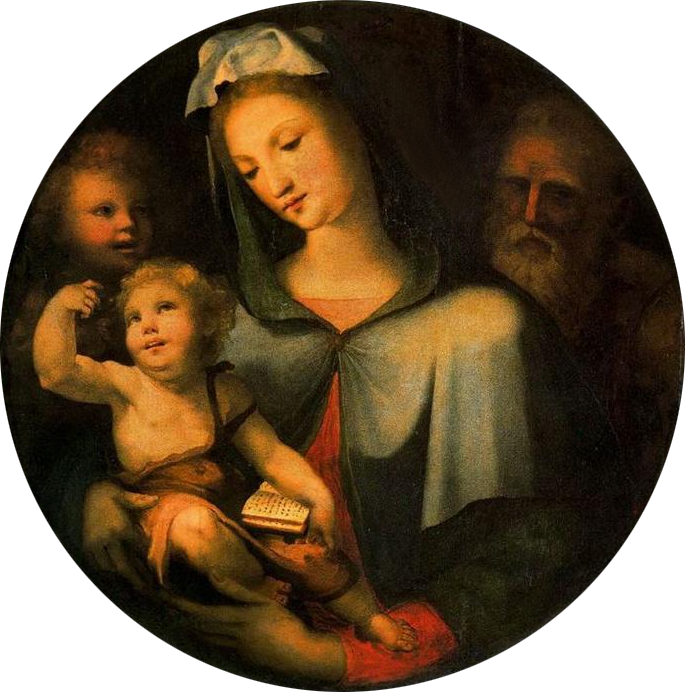
Holy Family with the Infant Saint John the Baptist (c. 1514–1515) by Domenico Beccafumi

Holy Family with the Infant Saint John the Baptist is an oil-on-wood painting by the Italian Mannerist painter Domenico Beccafumi, executed c. 1514–1515, now in the Uffizi in Florence.

== Description and style ==
On a dark background emerges the half figure of the Madonna holding the Child in her arms. Jesus holds a small book and raises an arm that shows a muscularity that is entirely inspired by Michelangelo. The elderly St. Joseph and St. John appear from the back. The typical characteristics of Beccafumi's art can be recognized in the sweetness of the shades, the light effects, the various and characterized physiognomies, and the simplification of the forms.

The painting is a tondo and measures 84 cm in diameter.

== History ==
The work and its frame carved with cherubs' heads is first recorded in 1624, when it appears attributed to Beccafumi in a Medici inventory. Of undisputed authorship, Judey (1932) dates it to 1520, Samminiatelli to 1518–19 by its stylistic similarities to his frescoes at the Oratory of the Compagnia di San Bernardino, Francini Ciaranfi to 1514–15 by comparison with the fresco Meeting at the Golden Gate at the ospedale di Santa Maria della Scala.
