= La Perla (Raphael) =

Painting by Raphael, c. 1518

The Holy Family
- La Perla
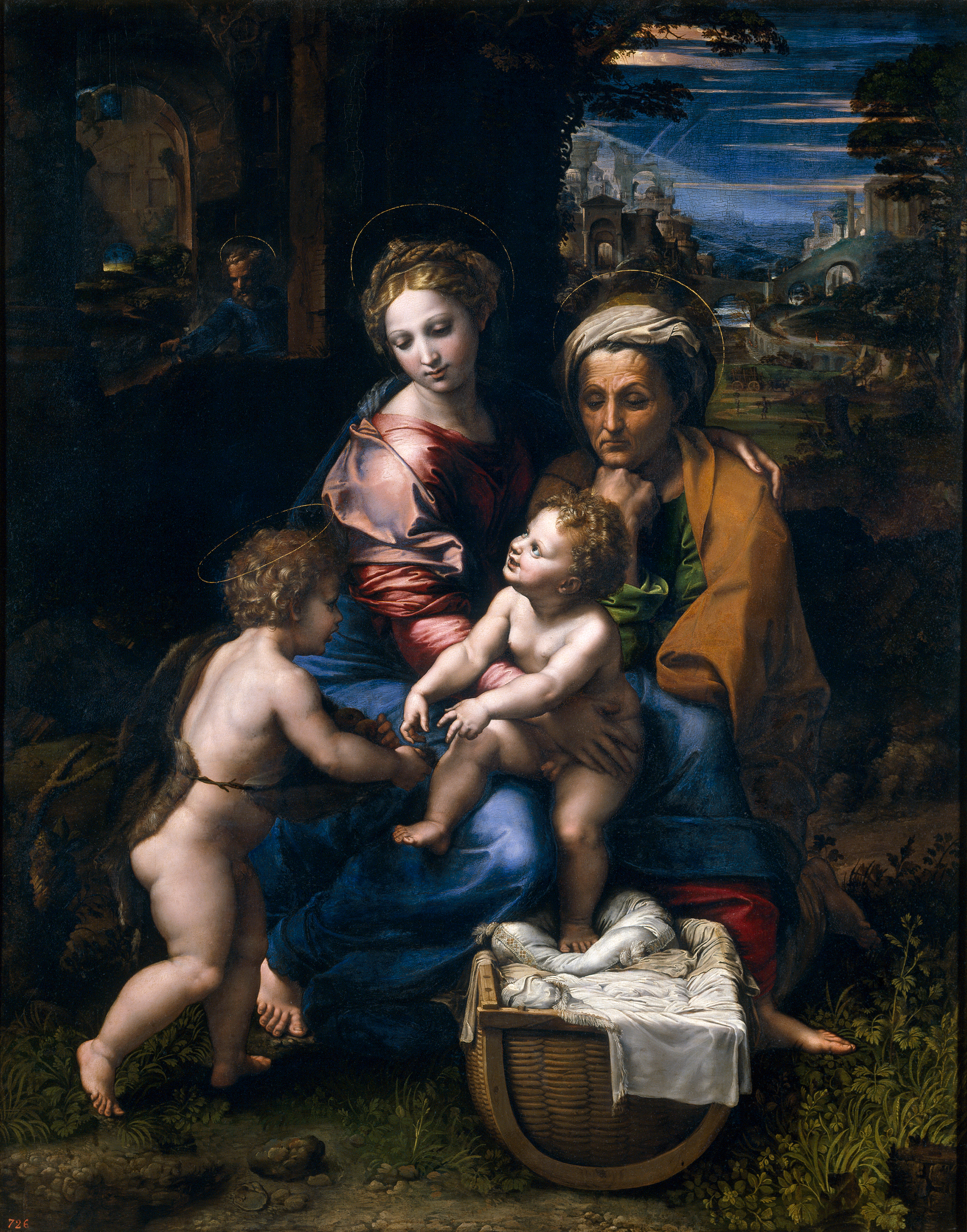
- Artist: Raphael
- Year: c. 1518
- Medium: Oil on panel
- Dimensions: 147.4 cm × 116 cm (58.0 in × 46 in)
- Location: Museo del Prado, Madrid

The Holy Family (Spanish: La Sagrada) more commonly known as La Perla (literally The Pearl) is a c. 1518 oil on panel painting by Raphael. It depicts the Madonna and Child with John the Baptist, Saint Anne and in the background Saint Joseph. At this stage clearly influenced by his encounter with Leonardo (1513-1516) the pyramidal arrangement of the characters, the light contrasts and the recreation of a landscape that is no longer idealized but realistic are proof of it.

The final composition differs from the preparatory drawing, even if it follows the countours of the drawing is simple to detect several details that have been corrected. X-Rays shows that there was a first version in the underlying layer that follows very much the original drawing (obvserved means of the reflectography). Therefore it is logical to point out that there were two phases in the execution of the canvas; a first one that followed the drawing and a later one that introduced substantial changes to the appearance of the work in order to produce a great tension instead of the initial serene calm of the characters. To achieve this, the children's heads were filled with curls, while the Virgins head was sharpened, the folds are complicated and sinuous and the contrast between light and shadow intensified.

It may be identifiable with the painting mentioned in Vasari's Lives of the Artists as made for Ludovico Canossa (Bayeux's bishop). Later Galeazzo Canossa ceded to Vincenzo I Gonzaga.The painting definitely passed to Charles I of England in 1627 and after his execution it passed into the hands of one of its creditors, Edward Bass, from whom Alonso de Cárdenas bought it on behalf of Don Luis de Haro. He gave it to Philip IV of Spain, who gave it its current name, since he saw it as "the pearl" of his collection (his favourite). It was taken to Paris in 1813 by Joseph Bonaparte and it remained there until 1815. It has been in collection of the Museo del Prado since 1857.

Part of another version has recently been found in the Galleria Estense in Modena, known as the Perla di Modena.

== See also ==
- List of paintings by Raphael

== Bibliography ==
- (in Italian) Pierluigi De Vecchi, Raffaello, Rizzoli, Milano 1975.
