= Girolamo di Benvenuto =

Italian painter (1470–1524)

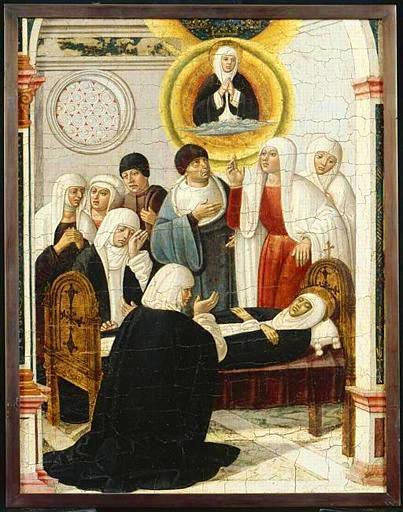
Girolamo di Benvenuto, Death of Catherine of Siena, 1500-1510 (Petit Palais, Avignon)

Girolamo di Benvenuto (September 1470 – June 1524) was an Italian painter of the High Renaissance and son of the painter Benvenuto di Giovanni.

== Life ==
Benvenuto was born and died in Siena. Learning the basics of art under his father's watchful supervision and trained in the traditional Sienese style of painting (he was a contemporary of Giacomo Pacchiarotti, Bernardino Fungai and Pinturicchio), he worked on several frescoes and altarpieces undertaken by his father's studio. His first independent work, The Assumption of Mary of 1498 for the city of Montalcino (whose museum still holds it), Girolamo shows several differences to his father's style, with more elongated figures with more pronounced expressions.

His most notable work, signed and dated to 1508, is his Madonna of the Snow, now in the Pinacoteca in Siena. It echoes two female portraits painted by him at about the same time (one in the National Gallery of Art, Washington). Surviving documents and works show he mainly produced religious works, but also created paintings on secular themes for domestic settings and cassoni - the latter include his Judgement of Paris tondo (intended for a bedroom and now in the Louvre).

A second work, of similar subject matter to the above work, is located in the National Gallery of Victoria, Australia. This work incorporates two medieval themes, and has been heralded as one of his finest works on display outside of Europe. The Gallery paid an undisclosed amount for this painting which was said to be in the tens of millions of dollars.

== Sources ==
- Diana Norman. Painting in Late Medieval and Renaissance Siena. (1260–1555). Yale University Press. 2003.
- Giulietta Dini. Five Centuries of Sienese Painting (From Duccio to the Birth of the Baroque). Thames & Hudson. 1998.
