= Sienese school =

Painting style developed in the 14th century Siena

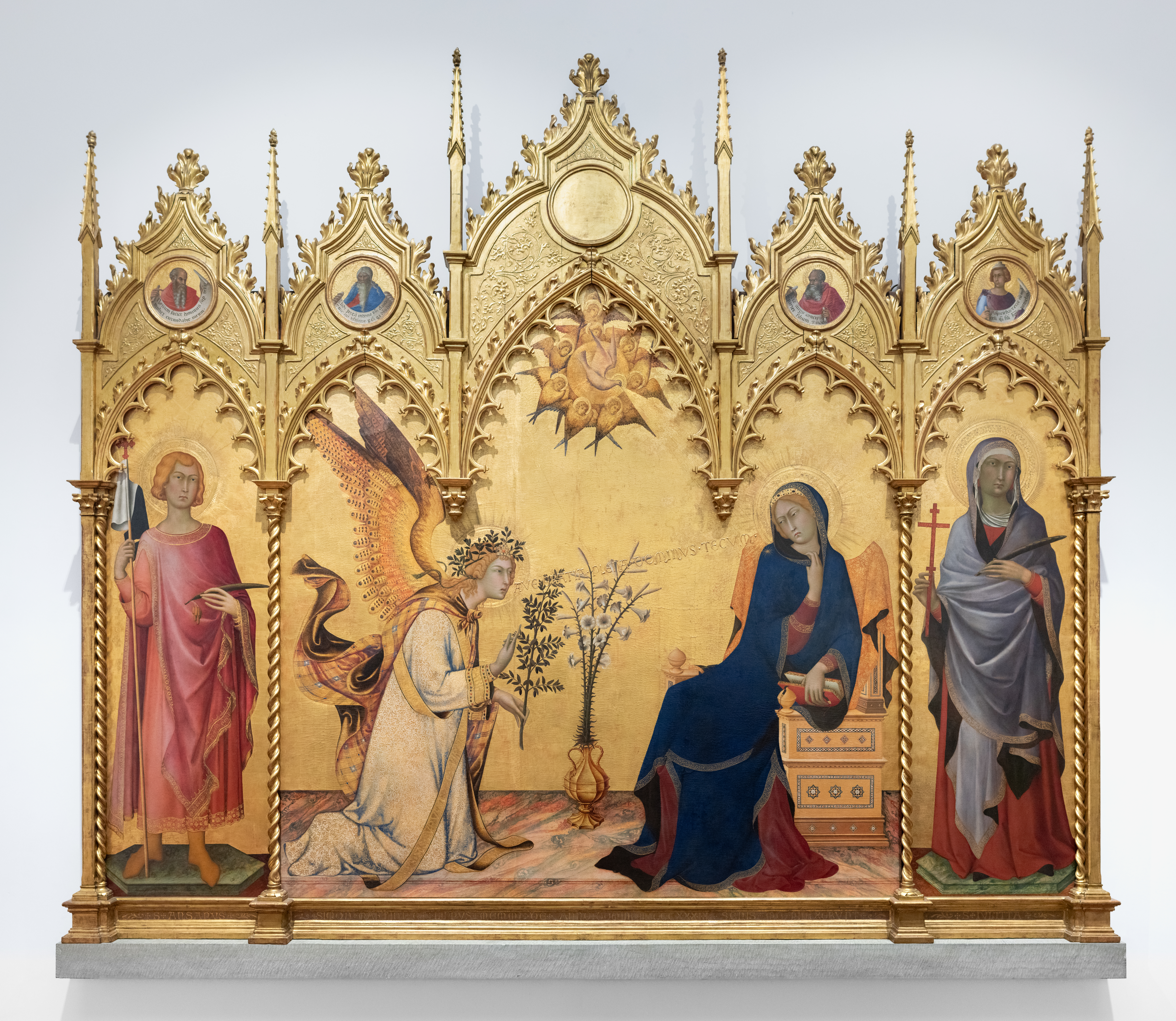
Simone Martini, Annunciation with St. Margaret and St. Ansanus, 1333

The Sienese school of painting flourished in Siena, Italy, between the 13th and 15th centuries. Its most important artists include Duccio, whose work shows Byzantine influence, his pupil Simone Martini, the brothers Pietro and Ambrogio Lorenzetti and Domenico and Taddeo di Bartolo, Sassetta, and Matteo di Giovanni.

== History ==
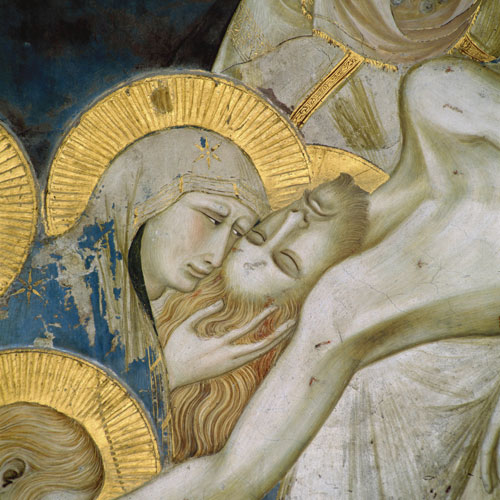
Pietro Lorenzetti, detail of the Deposition of Christ, Fresco in the Lower Basilica at Assisi

Duccio may be considered the "father of Sienese painting". The brothers Pietro and Ambrogio Lorenzetti were "responsible for a crucial development in Sienese art, moving from the tradition inherited from Duccio towards a Gothic style, incorporating the innovations in Florence introduced by Giotto and Arnolfo di Cambio".

"Sienese art flourished even when Siena itself had begun to decline economically and politically. And while the artists of 15th-century Siena did not enjoy the widespread patronage and respect that their 14th-century ancestors had received, the paintings and illuminated manuscripts they produced form one of the undervalued treasures in the bounty of Italian art."

In the late 15th century, Siena "finally succumbed" to the Florentine school's teachings on perspective and naturalistic representation, absorbing its "humanist culture". In the 16th century the Mannerists Beccafumi and Il Sodoma worked there. While Baldassare Peruzzi was born and trained in Siena, his major works and style reflect his long career in Rome. The economic and political decline of Siena by the 16th century, and its eventual subjugation by Florence, largely checked the development of Sienese painting, although it also meant that a good proportion of Sienese works in churches and public buildings were not discarded or destroyed.

== Style ==
Unlike Florentine art, Sienese art opted for a more decorative style and rich colors, with "thinner, elegant, and courtly figures". It also has "a mystical streak...characterized by a common focus on miraculous events, with less attention to proportions, distortions of time and place, and often dreamlike coloration". Sienese painters did not paint portraits, allegories, or classical myths.

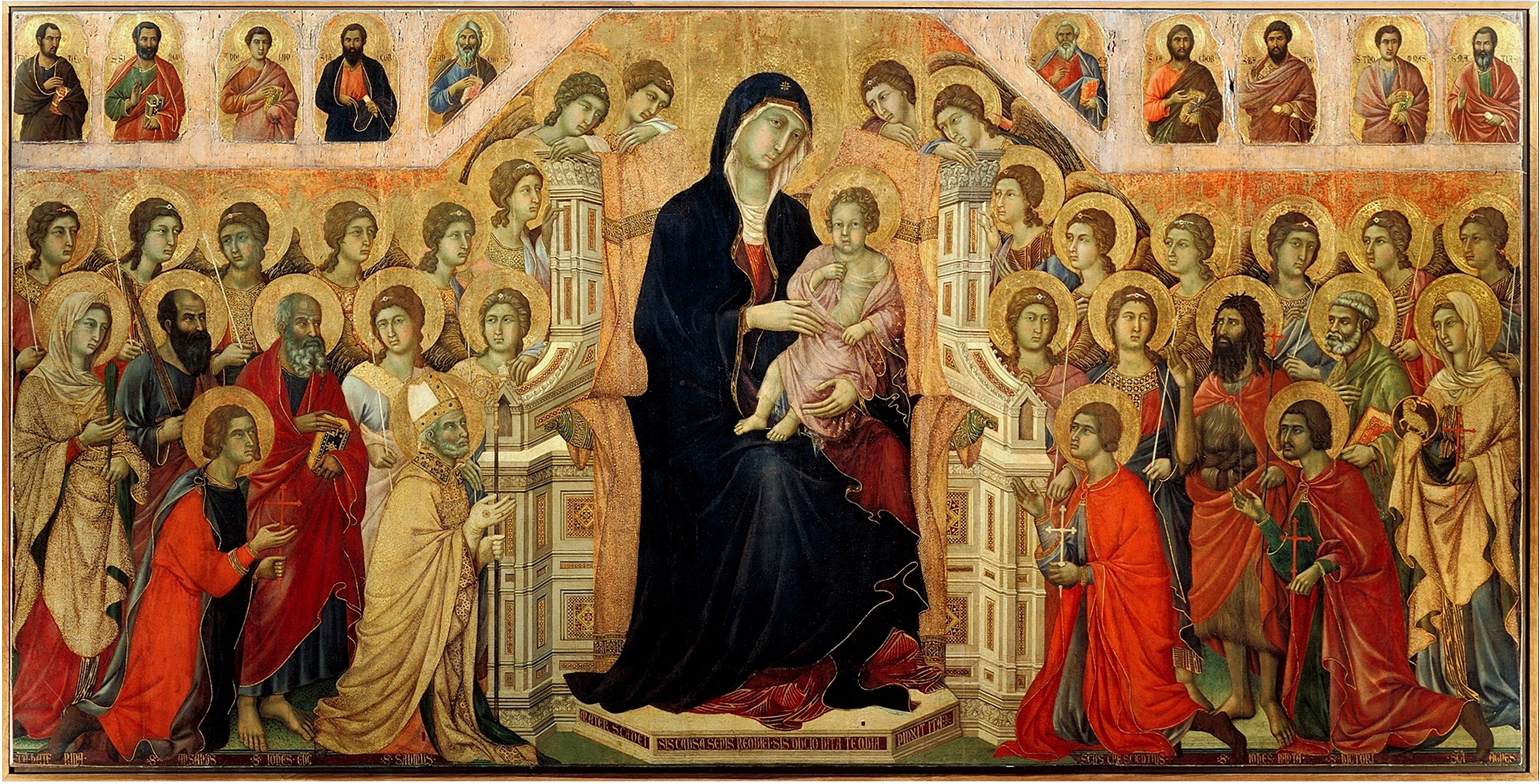
Maestà by Duccio (1308–11) Tempera on wood, 214 x 412 cm Museo dell'Opera del Duomo, Siena

== List of artists ==
=== 1251–1300 ===
- Guido da Siena

=== 1301–1350 ===
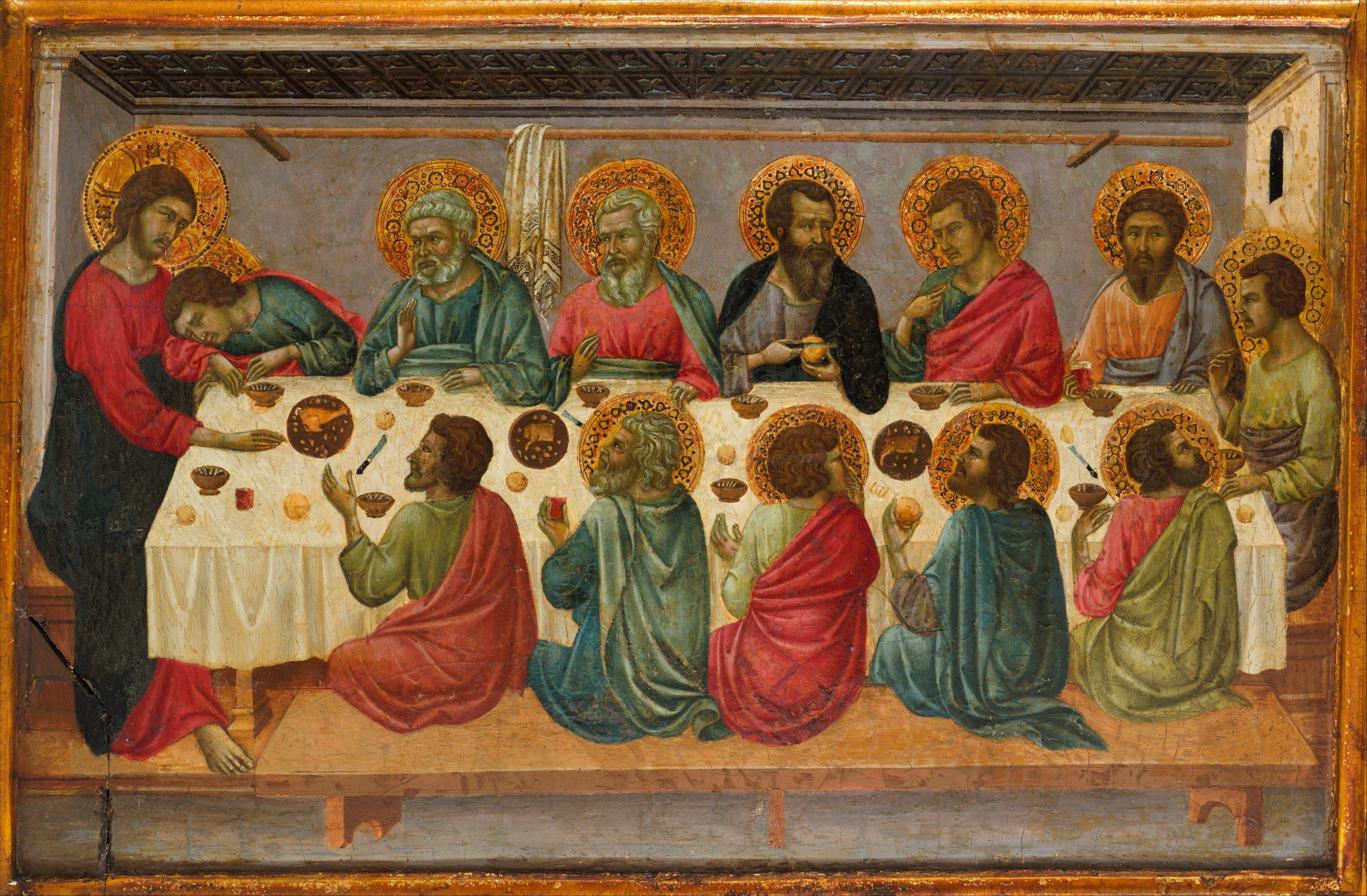
Ugolino di Nerio, predella scene of The Last Supper

- Duccio di Buoninsegna
- Segna di Buonaventura
- Niccolò di Segna
- Simone Martini
- Lippo Memmi
- Naddo Ceccarelli
- Ambrogio Lorenzetti
- Pietro Lorenzetti
- Bartolomeo Bulgarini
- Ugolino di Nerio
- Lippo Vanni

=== 1351–1400 ===
- Bartolo di Fredi
- Andrea Vanni
- Francesco di Vannuccio
- Jacopo di Mino del Pellicciaio
- Niccolò di Bonaccorso
- Niccolò di Ser Sozzo
- Luca di Tommè
- Taddeo di Bartolo
- Andrea di Bartolo
- Paolo di Giovanni Fei
- (Master of the Richardson Triptych)
- Biagio Goro Ghezzi

=== 1401–1450 ===
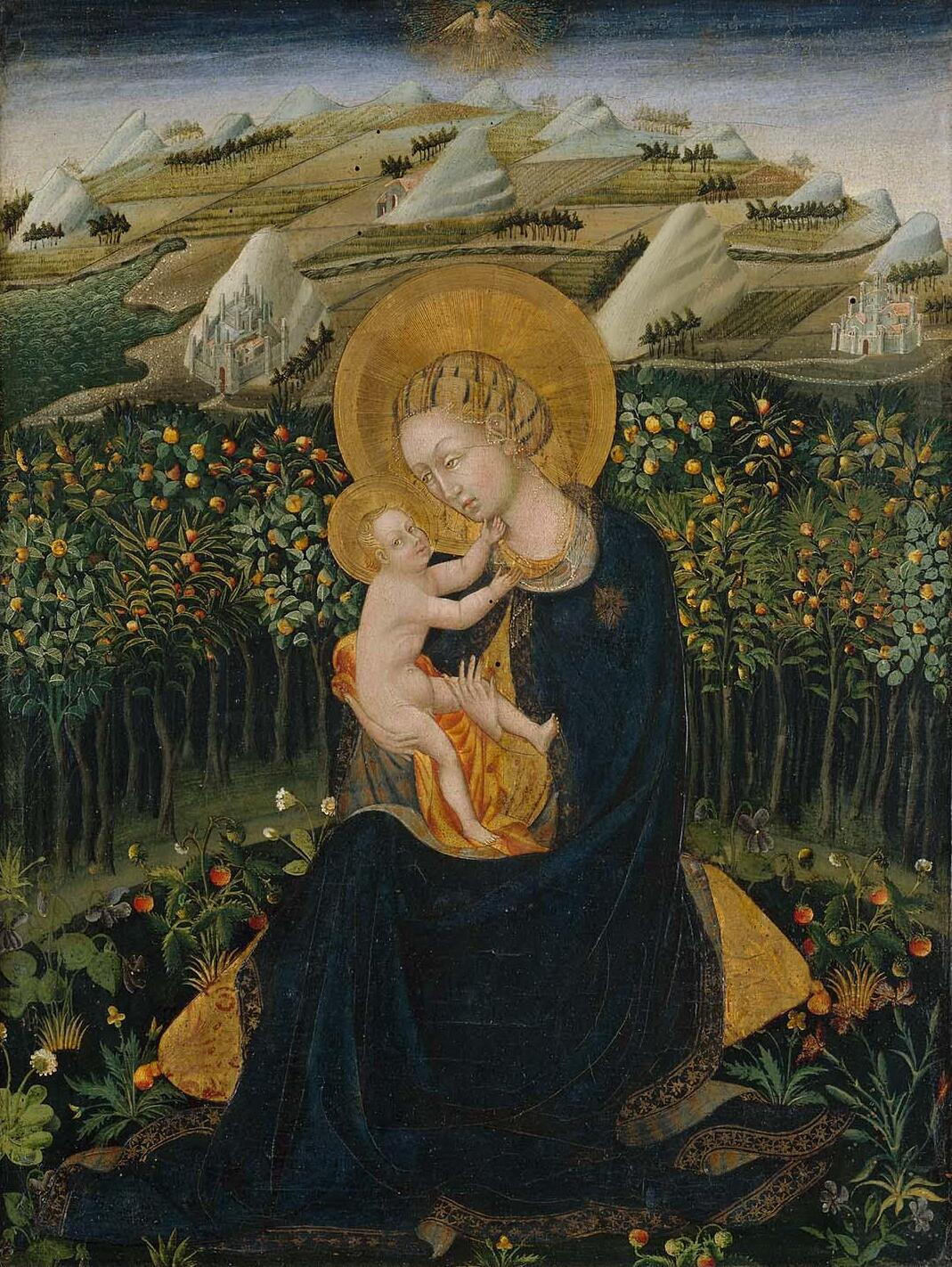
Giovanni di Paolo, Madonna of Humility, c. 1442

- Benedetto di Bindo
- Domenico di Bartolo
- Giovanni di Paolo
- Gregorio di Cecco
- Martino di Bartolomeo
- Master of the Osservanza Triptych
- Pietro di Giovanni d'Ambrogio
- Priamo della Quercia
- Sano di Pietro
- Sassetta (Stefano di Giovanni)
- Lorenzo di Pietro (Vecchietta)

=== 1451–1500 ===
- Nicola di Ulisse
- Matteo di Giovanni
- Benvenuto di Giovanni
- Carlo di Giovanni
- Francesco di Giorgio Martini
- Neroccio di Bartolomeo de' Landi
- Pietro di Francesco degli Orioli
- Guidoccio Cozzarelli
- Bernardino Fungai
- Pellegrino di Mariano
- Andrea di Niccolò
- Pietro di Domenico

=== 1501–1550 ===
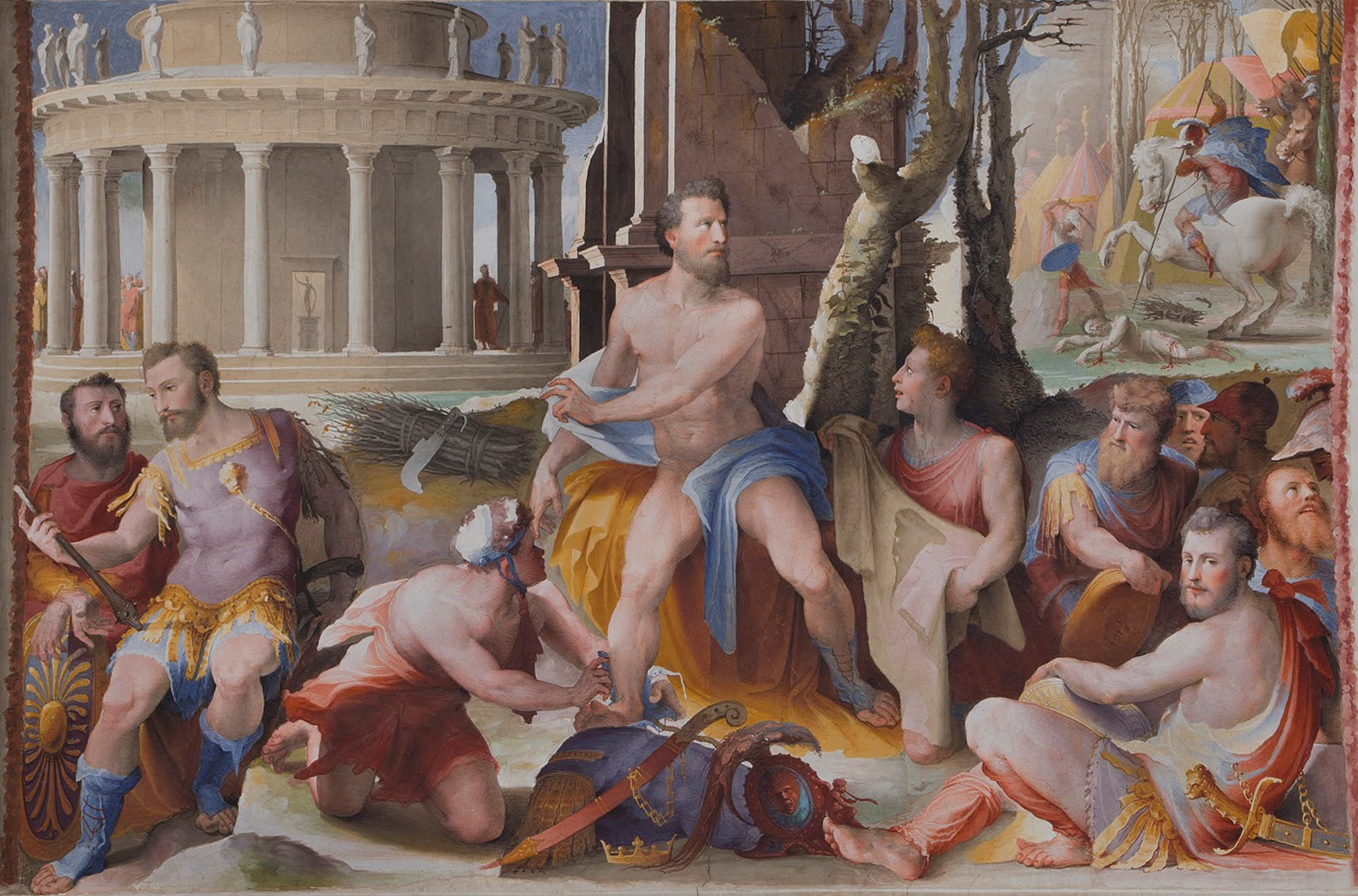
Domenico Beccafumi, Public Virtues of Greek and Roman Heroes – The Sacrifice of King Codron of Athens, fresco, c. 1530

- Girolamo di Benvenuto
- Giacomo Pacchiarotti
- Girolamo del Pacchia
- Domenico Beccafumi
- Il Sodoma (Giovanni Antonio Bazzi)
- Riccio Sanese (Bartolomeo Neroni)

=== 1601–1650 ===
- Francesco Vanni
- Ventura Salimbeni
- Rutilio Manetti

== See also ==
- Bolognese school
- Lucchese school
- School of Ferrara
- Florentine school
