= Santi Matteo e Margherita, Ortignano =

Italian Catholic parish church

Coordinates: 43°40′37.308″N 11°44′56.688″E

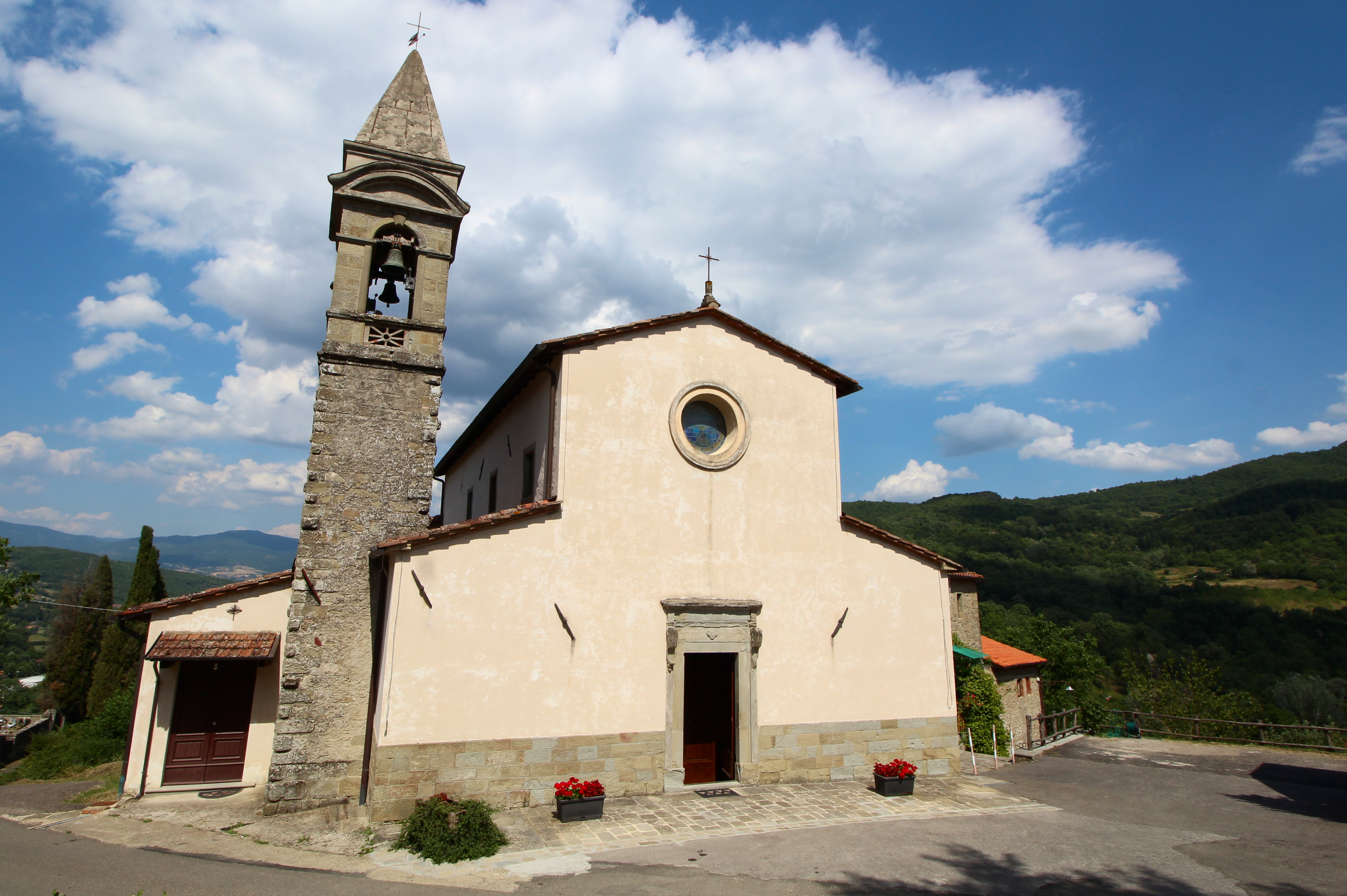
Exterior of the church Santi Matteo e Margherita

Santi Matteo e Margherita is a Catholic parish church in the frazione of Ortignano in the town of Ortignano Raggiolo, province of Arezzo, region of Tuscany, Italy. The church is part of the Diocese of Arezzo-Cortona-Sansepolcro.

Originally solely dedicated to Santa Margherita, upon its elevation to parish in 1699, it was also dedicated to St Matthew. The interior once housed paintings from the Sienese school, including a tempera altarpiece depicting a Madonna and Child with Saints by Giacomo Pacchiarotto, now in the Museo Diocesano of Arezzo.
