= Bernardino Fungai =

Italian painter (1460 – c. 1516)

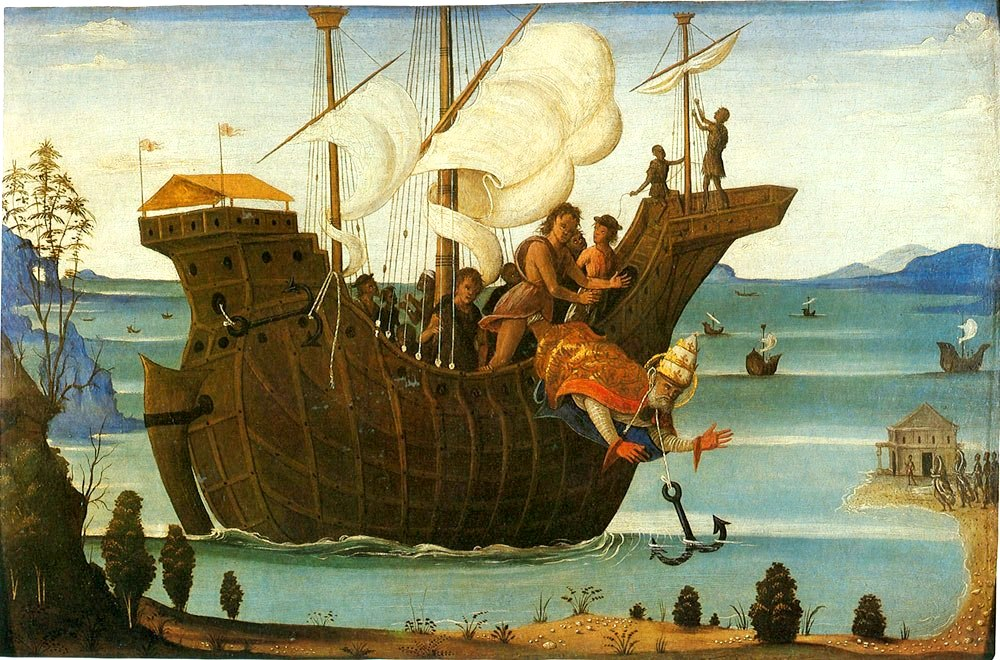
Martyrdom of St Clement

Bernardino Fungai (1460 – c. 1516) was an Italian painter whose work marks the transition from late Gothic painting to the early Renaissance in the Sienese school. He maintained a fairly archaic style in his works, which are mainly of a devotional nature.

== Life ==
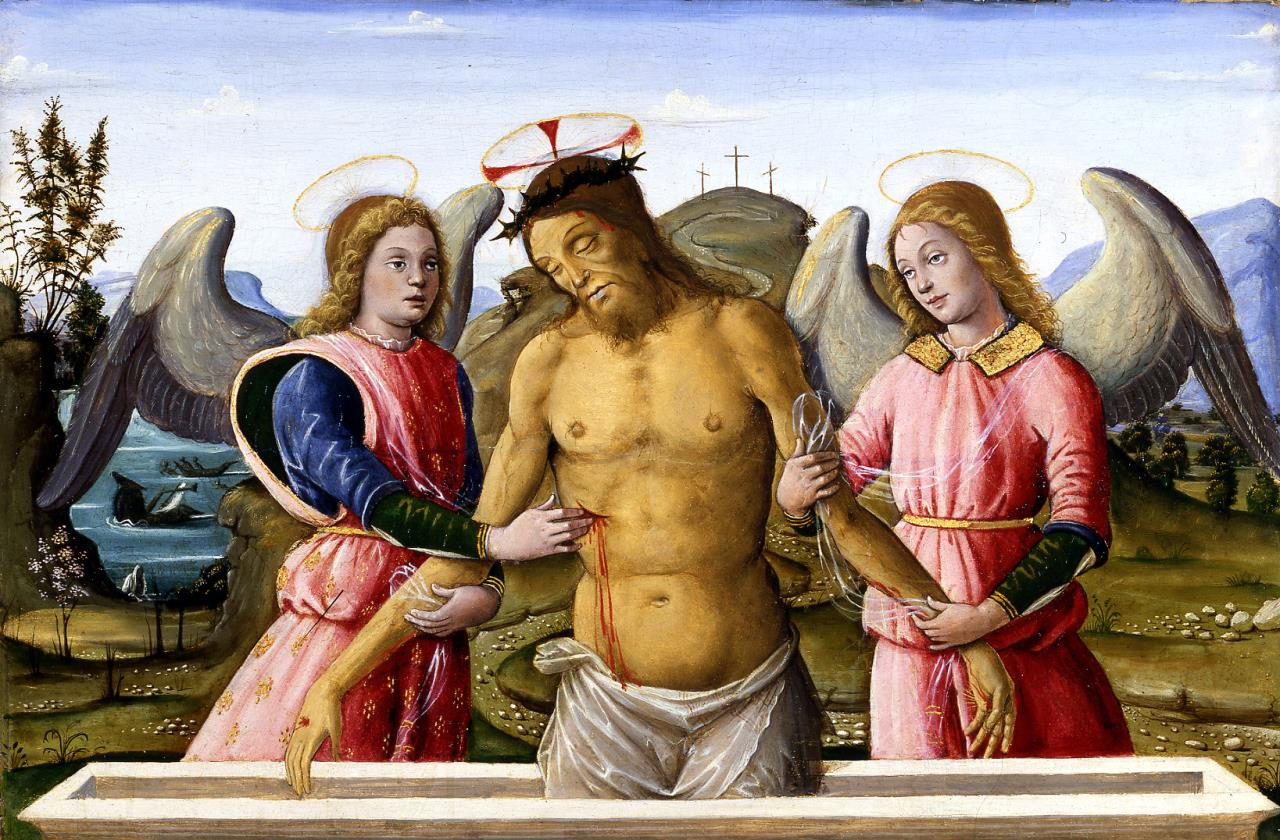
The dead Christ supported by two Angels

Fungai's real name was Bernardino Cristofano di Niccolò d'Antonio di Pietro da Fungaia. His family came originally from a village near Siena called Fungaia. He is recorded as a pupil of Benvenuto di Giovanni in 1482 while working on frescoes for the cupola in the Siena Cathedral.

Fungai was commissioned in 1494 to decorate ceremonial banners with azure and gold. He also created an altarpiece in 1512 for a Sienese church.

== Work ==
A fairly sizeable oeuvre has been ascribed to Bernardino Fungai on the basis of a signed and dated altarpiece executed for San Niccolò al Carmine in Siena depicting the Virgin and Child Enthroned with the Saints Sebastian, Jerome, Nicholas and Anthony of Padua (1512, Pinacoteca Nazionale di Siena, Siena).

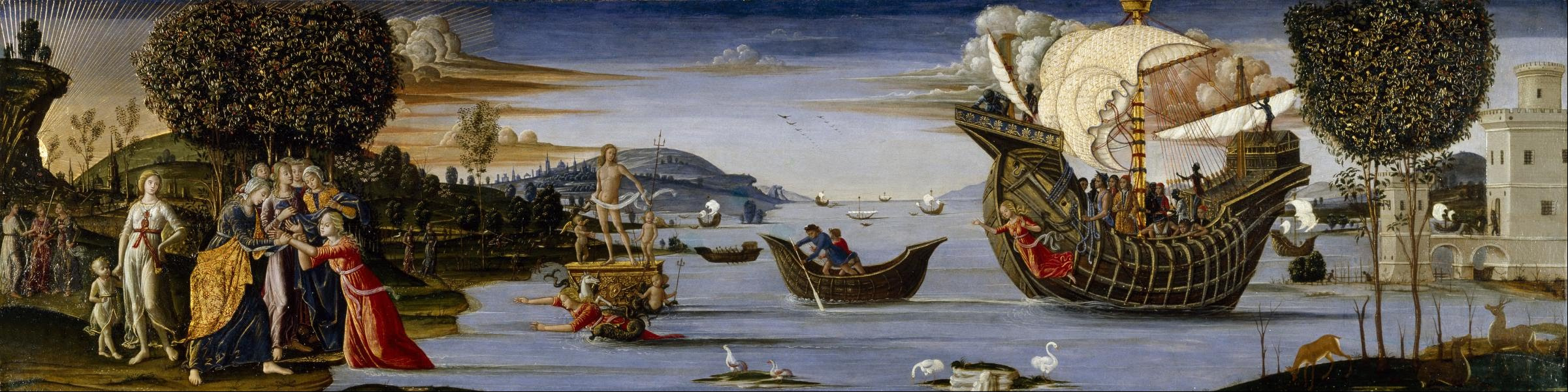
The beloved of Enalus sacrificed to Poseidon and spared

He is described as a retardataire follower of Sassetta and Giovanni di Paolo. His paintings evince an influence from local Sienese painters and contemporary artists such as Pietro Perugino, Pietro di Francesco degli Orioli, Luca Signorelli and Bernardino Pinturicchio.

The many devotional paintings of Bernardino Fungai are rather conventional but his few cassone paintings and the landscapes in his larger devotional compositions show his narrative gift. The quality of his landscapes is already clear in Bernardino Fungai's earliest recorded work dated to 1495–97, a Stigmatisation of St Catherine in the Santuario Cateriniano at Fontebranda. The composition reveals a panorama of graceful buildings, gentle hills and tall trees with an extensive sea in the back enlivened with small boats. The contrast in the composition between the solid, hard-edged and hieratic figures of the main scene and the small background and predella figures with dancelike poses and freely moving drapery is also typical of his style.
