= Giacomo Pacchiarotti =

Italian painter

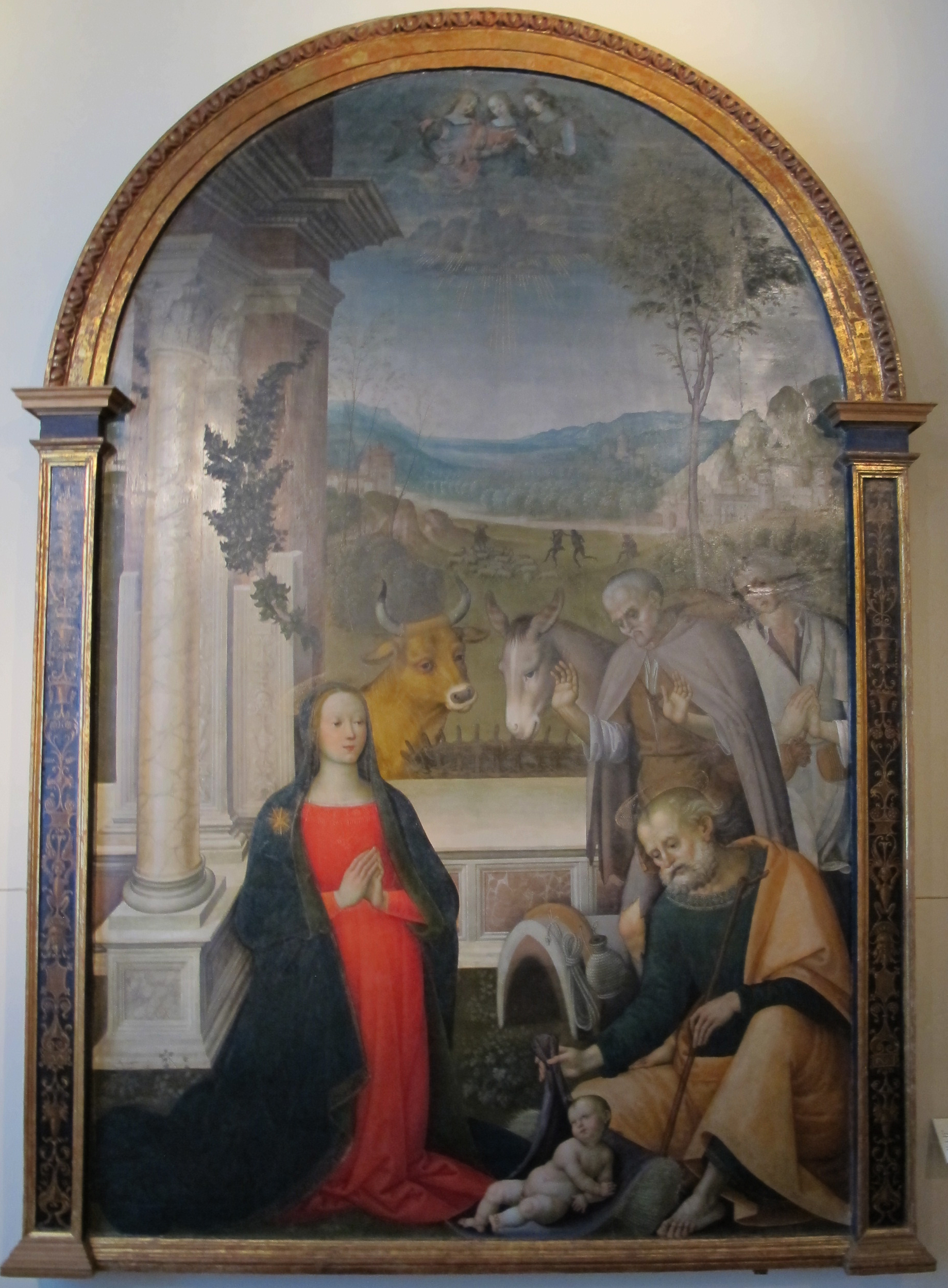
Virgin and Child by Giacomo Pacchiarotti, Pinacoteca Nazionale, Siena

Giacomo Pacchiarotti (Italian: [ˈdʒaːkomo pakkjaˈrɔtti]; 1474 – 1539 or 1540), or Jacopo Pacchiarotto (Italian: [ˈjaːkopo pakkjaˈrɔtto]), was an Italian painter.

== Life and works ==
He was born in Siena, and worked there. Bernardino Fungai may have been his teacher; Pacchiarotti's style is influenced by Fungai, as well as Matteo di Giovanni, Perugino, and Signorelli. He fled to France where he joined Rosso Fiorentino in the work at Fontainebleau. He may be the Girolamo di Pacchia mentioned by Vasari in his chapter on il Sodoma. He painted a St. Catherine and St. Catherine visits the body of Agnes of Montepulciano now in the Pinacoteca of Siena. He painted frescoes on the Birth of the Virgin and the Annunciation for the church of San Bernardino.

A number of his paintings are in Siena.

He is recorded as having been a designer for pageants, and was active in the Sienese resistance against Florence.

One of his most important works is a tempera on panel representing the Madonna and Child with Saints, was once housed in the Church of Santi Margherita e Matteo in Ortignano Raggiolo, in the province of Arezzo.

== Legacy ==
Pacchiarotti's role in the Sienese resistance inspired Pacchiarotto, and How He Worked in Distemper, the title poem of a collection of the same name by Robert Browning, published in 1876. It is a comic poem attacking Browning's critics.
