= Michelozzo =

Italian architect and sculptor

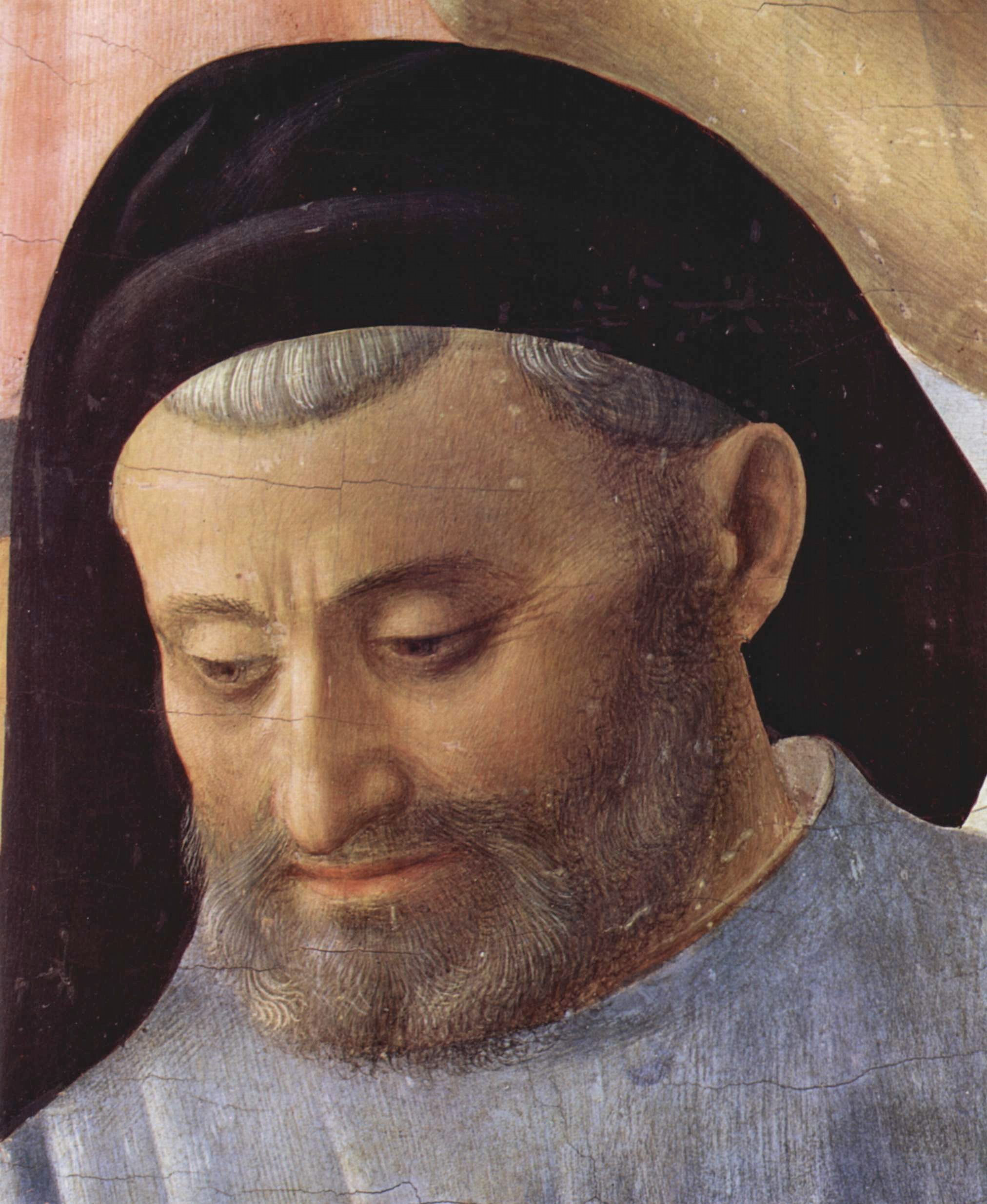
- Portrait from Fra Angelico's Deposition
- Born: Michelozzo di Bartolomeo Michelozzi c. 1396; Florence, Republic of Florence
- Died: 7 October 1472 (aged 75–76); Florence, Republic of Florence
- Resting place: Monastery of San Marco, Florence
- Known for: Sculpture, architecture
- Movement: Early Renaissance
- Spouse: Francesca di Ambrogio Galigari (m. 1441)
- Children: 7

Michelozzo di Bartolomeo Michelozzi (Italian: [mikeˈlɔttso di bartoloˈmɛːo mikeˈlɔttsi]; c. 1396 – 7 October 1472), known mononymously as Michelozzo, was an Italian architect and sculptor. Considered one of the great pioneers of architecture during the Renaissance, Michelozzo was a favored Medici architect who was extensively employed by Cosimo de' Medici. He was a pupil of Lorenzo Ghiberti in his early years, and later collaborated with Donatello.

Known primarily for designing Palazzo Medici Riccardi in Florence, he is often overshadowed by his contemporaries Donatello in sculpture and Brunelleschi in architecture.

== Life ==
=== Early life ===
Michelozzo was born in Florence in 1396. He was the son of Bartolomeo di Gherardo Borgognone and Antonia. Borgognone was of French origin and arrived in Florence from Burgundy at an unknown date. Borgognone lived and worked in the Santa Croce quarter of Florence as a tailor, and was made a Florentine citizen on 9 April 1376. Michelozzo had three brothers named Leonardo (b. 1389/90), Zanobi (b. 1391), and Giovanni (b. 1403). By 1391, Michelozzo's family had moved to the San Giovanni quarter, where they continued to live throughout his life.

Little is known about Michelozzo's childhood, other than that he received a comprehensive education in reading, writing, and arithmetic, and that he began working as a die-engraver for the Florentine mint in 1410. As an engraver, Michelozzo learned how to cast, chase, and gild copper and bronze, two of the metals in which the Medieval and Renaissance goldsmith most commonly worked. He also gained immense precision of hand and a mastery of sculptural design in miniature.

Beginning in the early 1420s, Michelozzo became a member of the Arte dei Maestri di Pietra e Legname, one of the Guilds of Florence that represented the master stonemasons, wood-carvers, and sculptors. He later served as one of the consuls of the Guild in 1430.

Michelozzo's father died sometime before 1427, and his mother passed sometime between 1433 and 1442. Michelozzo retained the family residence on Via Larga, which was near the Medici Palace and next door to the humanist Bartolomeo Scala. In addition, Michelozzo possessed a house and garden in S. Domino a Brozzi.

=== Apprenticeships ===
Beginning in 1420, Michelozzo studied under Lorenzo Ghiberti. Michelozzo's first projects with Ghiberti was the North Door of the Baptistry between the years 1417 and 1423/4, in which Michelozzo's responsibilities "could only have been in the chasing and gilding of the panels, possibly in casting the four late reliefs...and in the frame....Most of his work on the doors is submerged, like that of the other assistants, in the force of Ghiberti's design and personality." From this, Michelozzo learned how to run a closely supervised shop, how to organize it efficiently, how to train and control assistants, and how to deal shrewdly in business and financial affairs. "He was exposed to Ghiberti's use of antique motifs, he absorbed Ghiberti's ability in juxtaposing antique and Gothic elements, and he was undoubtedly influenced by Ghiberti's style and artistic concepts." While working under Ghiberti, Michelozzo created the statue of the young St. John over the door of the Duomo in Florence, opposite the Baptistery, along with the silver statuette of John the Baptist on the altar-frontal of San Giovanni. In his tax declaration of 1427 Michelozzo calls himself as "in partnership" with Ghiberti.

Under Donatello, Michelozzo assisted in the building of the sacristy of Santa Trinita, where "Ghiberti [had] started to fuse together late-Gothic and antique forms." Both Donatello and Michelozzo began as sculptors with an uncompromising dedication to antiquity, and this was evident when Donatello enlisted Michelozzo's help in the decoration of the tabernacle of St. Louis of Toulouse. Michelozzo also became the partner responsible for the architectural frames of Donatello's sculptures such as the funerary monument of Antipope John XXIII. In 1428, together with Donatello, Michelozzo erected an open-air pulpit at an angle of the Cathedral of St. Stephen at Prato, designed for the regular public displays of their famous relic, the Girdle of Thomas (Sacra Cintola). Though Donatello is the more well-known of the two, "it would be a mistake to underrate Michelozzo's share in the work, for where Donatello appears as the sole designer of architectural ornament his style is quite different. He completely subordinates the architectural setting to his sculpture and makes architecture, so to speak, its handmaid. The beautiful ornamental sculpture in Brunelleschi's Sagrestia Vecchia shows how far Donatello would go with his sculpture in order to provide it with an effective frame in the extraordinarily vigorous modelling of the broad, slanting surrounds of his overdoors and medallions."

== Influences and patronage ==
=== Cosimo de' Medici ===
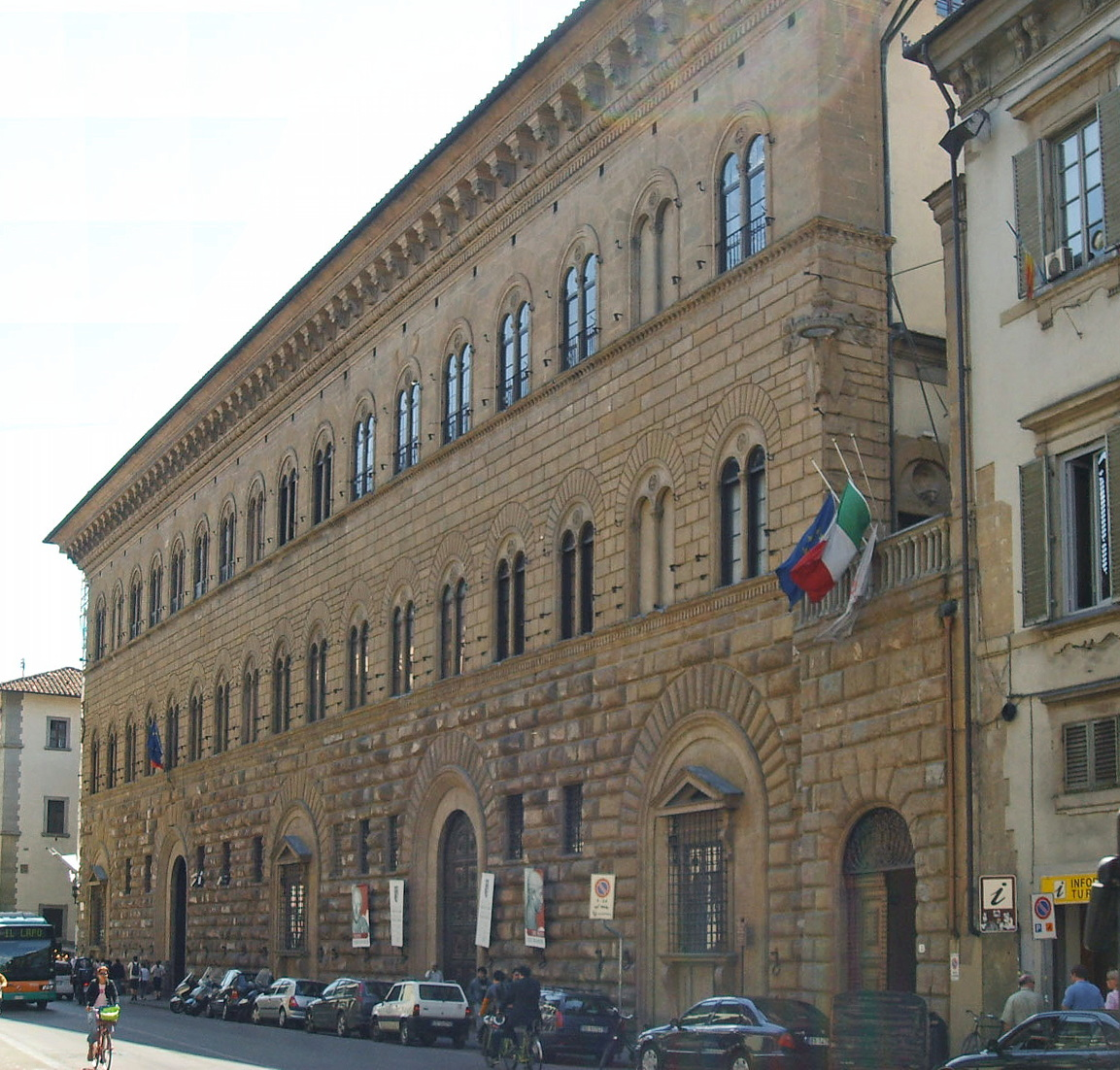
The facade of Palazzo Medici in Florence

Few historians have disputed Cosimo's close relationship to Michelozzo, who was the Medici architect for nearly forty years. "Michelozzo was more agreeable and accessible to the advice and desires of Cosimo than the turbulent Brunelleschi, and was willing to follow the strong personal tastes of his patron." Their relationship was best described by Angelo Fabroni in 1789, who said: "Cosimo loved Michelozzo dearly and relied on him, not only because of his natural talents (he considered nobody, not even Brunelleschi, superior in all architectural judgments), but also because of his good qualities and worthy character."

Michelozzo enjoyed a close relationship to Cosimo de' Medici throughout his life, and according to Giorgio Vasari in The Lives of the Most Excellent Painters, Sculptors, and Architects, from Cimabue to Our Times, was motivated by his great love and fidelity for Cosimo to accompany him into exile in Venice from 1433 to 1434. Historians have cited this as an unparalleled example of esteem between artist and patron. Vasari also claimed that Michelozzo built the library of San Giorgio Monastery in 1434 for Cosimo, though this claim contradicts the original description and documents of the library, which indicate that although the library's construction was started by Cosimo, it was largely built under the direction of Medici bank manager Giovanni d'Orino Lanfredini between 1467 and 1478, which was well after Michelozzo's departure from Venice.

The large Palazzo Medici in Florence, built by Cosimo, was designed by him; it is one of the noblest specimens of Italian fifteenth-century architecture, in which the great taste and skill of the architect has combined the delicate lightness of the earlier Italian Gothic with the massive stateliness of the classical style. With great engineering skill Michelozzo shored up, and partly rebuilt, the Palazzo Vecchio, then in a ruinous condition, and added to it many important rooms and staircases. When, in 1437, through Cosimo's liberality, the monastery of San Marco at Florence was handed over to the Dominicans of Fiesole, Michelozzo was employed to rebuild the domestic part and remodel the church. For Cosimo he designed numerous other buildings, most of them of noteworthy importance. Among these were a guest-house at Jerusalem for the use of Florentine pilgrims, Cosimo's summer villa at Careggi, and the fortified castello that he rebuilt from 1452 as the Villa Medicea di Cafaggiolo in Mugello. For Giovanni de' Medici, Cosimo's son, he also built a very large villa at Fiesole. Between 1445 and 1451, he also expanded Villa San Girolamo next to Villa Medici at the behest of Cosimo.

=== Filippo Brunelleschi ===
According to "Architecture in Italy, 1400–1500, Volume 53", Michelozzo's architecture contrasts with Brunelleschi in its closer adherence to the "immediately preceding Gothic tradition, the Gothic classicism which appears in the Loggia dei Lanzi or the monastery of S. Matteo." Ludwig Heydenreich and Paul Davies argue that all of Michelozzo's buildings are "works of considerable standing...the most independent architect after Brunelleschi."

== Personal life ==
Michelozzo married Francesca, daughter of Piero di Ambrogio Galligari, in late January or February 1441. At the time of their marriage, she was 20 years old, and he was 45. Francesca's dowry of 425 florins was about average for an upper-middle-class family at that time. The size of her dowry indicates a considerable rise in Michelozzo's social position.

In 1441, Michelozzo launched a legal complaint to remove himself from the responsibility of his two older brothers' debts. Andrea di Benozo, representative for Giovanni, Zanobi, and Michelozzo, elected arbitrators to weigh the complaints. After studying documents and proofs for six weeks, the arbitrators found that the two brothers were the cause behind most of Michelozzo's debts, and they were required to relinquish their inheritance in partial compensation for the amounts they owed.

=== Children ===
Four boys and three girls resulted from Michelozzo's marriage to Francesca, of whom five survived their father. Bartolomeo, who became a sculptor, was born in 1442; Piero in 1443; Antonia in 1445; Niccolo in 1447; Marietta in 1453; Bernardo in 1455; and Lisabetta in 1459.

Two of his sons, Niccolò and Bernardo, were partially educated by the Medici and may have lived in the Palazzo Medici during their youth. They later achieved success in the highest humanistic circles of Florence.

Bernardo became a member of the household of Lorenzo il Magnifico as the tutor of Piero de Medici. In 1500, he was made a Florentine canon and was employed by Giovanni de Medici, first as his Chamberlain and then as his Secretary and Referendary.

Like Bernardo, Niccolò studied with Ficino from a young age and took part in the Platonic Academy, where he formed friendships with other Florentine humanists who shared his love for antiquity. He excelled in literature and philosophy, and he later became secretary to Piero di Cosimo and continued in the post under Piero di Lorenzo. In 1469, Niccolò began his political career as a notary in the Florentine Cancelleria, and he was often sent on important missions as ambassador for the Florentine Republic between 1489 and 1494. Following the downfall of the Medici, he was imprisoned for a brief time before clearing his name in 1496 and becoming the precounsel of the Arte dei Giucidi e notai and later succeeded Niccolò Machiavelli as the Second Chancellor of the Republic in 1513.

== Works ==
=== Palazzo Medici ===
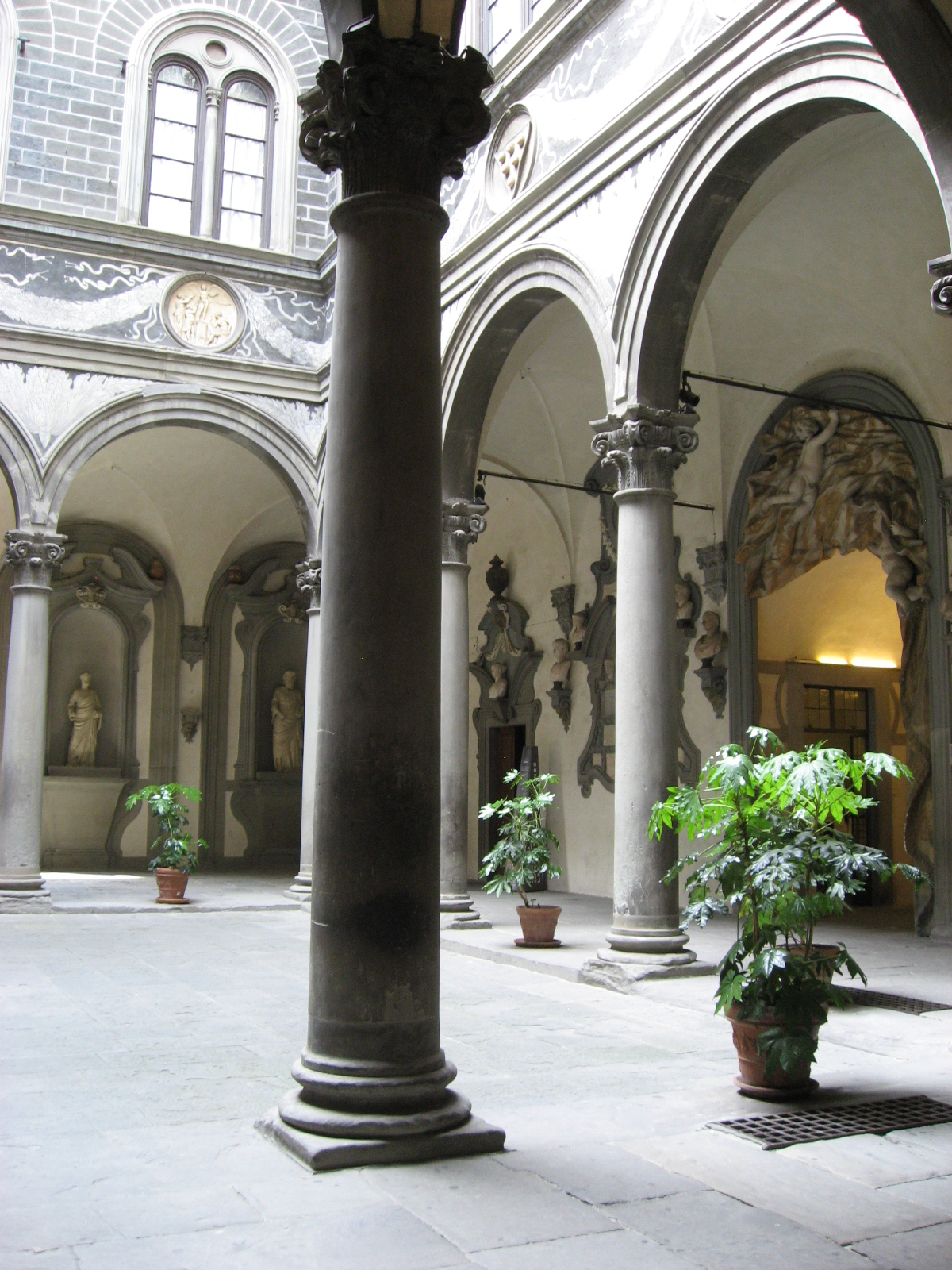
The courtyard of Palazzo Medici Riccardi

When Cosimo began building the Palazzo Medici in 1444, he passed over Brunelleschi and gave his preference to Michelozzo. Like the exterior of the Palazzo Comunale in Montefiascone, that of the Palazzo Medici follows the tradition of the Tuscan late-medieval palazzo, but without the more eye-catching symbols of civic power, which would have been incompatible with Cosimo's role as primus inter pares and pater patriae. The palazzo's exterior is not articulated by Vitruvian orders, and its big arches of its ground floor are not aligned with the windows of the upper stories. Instead, Michelozzo focused on the contrast between surface textures, such as the contrast between "the natural rustication of the ground floor, the flat ashlared courses of the piano nobile and the smooth masonry of the upper storey." The exterior also differs from the palazzo in Montepulciano in its size, its more urbane character, and its massive classicizing cornice. "In its succession of dentils, egg-and-dart and consoles, Michelozzo directly followed the Temple of Serapis in Rome."

Brunelleschi's influence on Michelozzo is evident in the palazzo's design, especially in the late-medieval bifora windows, the symmetry and the dominance of the entrance axis, and the combination of traditional and progressive elements. The arcades and entablature of the palazzo's courtyard also follows the model of the loggia of the Spedale degli Innocenti, which is symptomatically Brunelleschi's earliest and most un-Vitruvian building.

One of Michelozzo's most well-known architectural projects, the palace led to the development of a new architectural type: the Florentine Renaissance palace. Among the many Michelozzo innovations on the facade, the most notable include: "the use of bugnato digradante (large unevenly-cut stones which grow lighter as they ascend on the upper stories), the classical columns and fluted capitals in the bifore windows, the great classical cornice crowning the building and the small ones dividing the stories, the massive rectangular proportions of the block of square, and the regularity of the disposition of the windows, which, however, are asymmetrical in regard to the doors."

=== San Marco ===
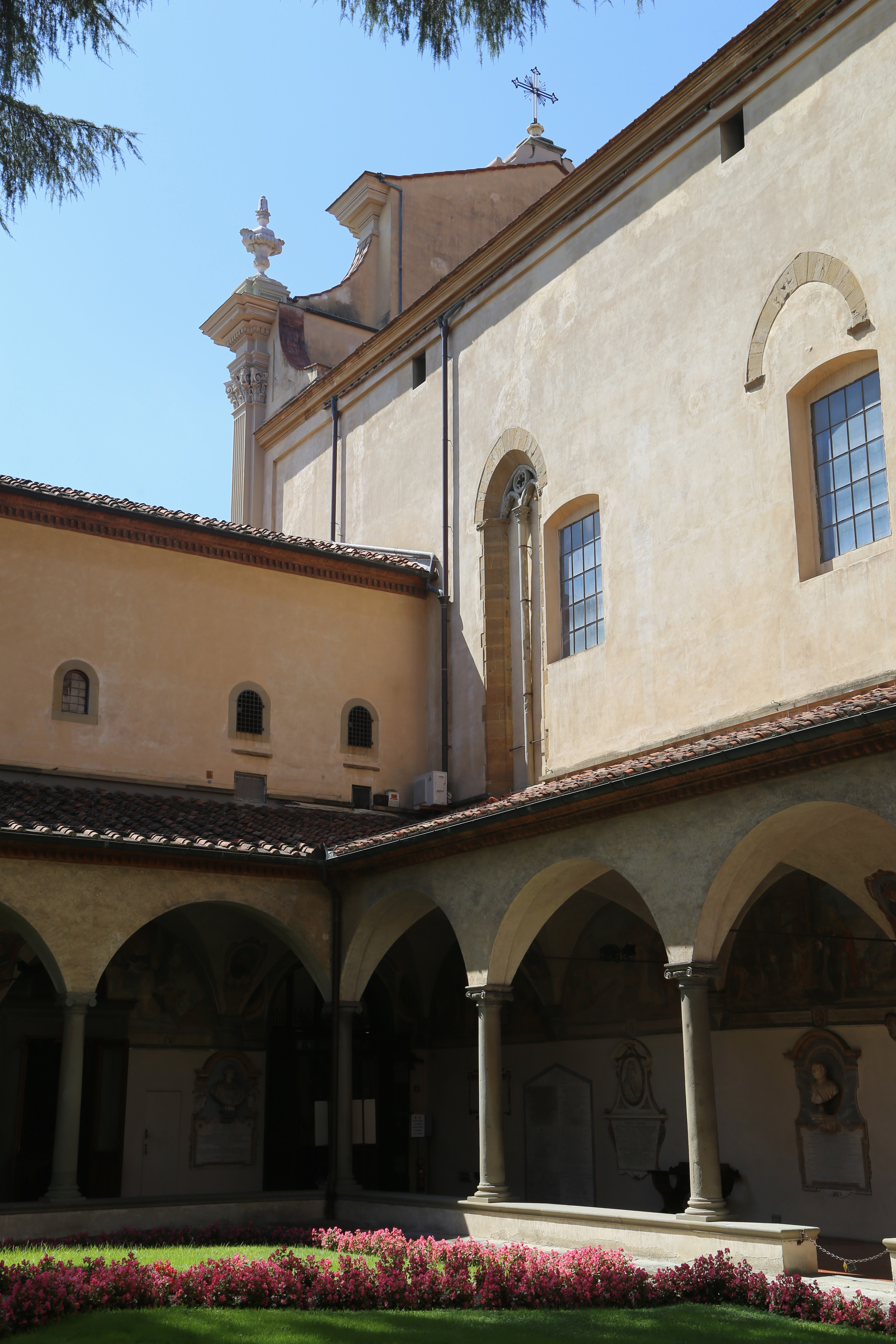
San Marco in Florence

The fundamental basis of all monastic compounds built by architects during the Renaissance, this was one of Michelozzo's first and most influential architectural projects in Florence. Constructed at the expense of Cosimo de' Medici, the project began sometime between the years 1437 and 1438. Reconstruction included the church, sacristy, cloister, monastic living quarters, and the library. San Marco has been called the first Renaissance church, though it seems to be a compromise between the Trecento tradition and the Renaissance spirit. The plain white walls without frescos differ from the coloristic tradition of the Trecento and were essential to Michelozzo's architectural concepts and preference for large, unadorned surfaces, subtly articulated by necessary structural members in grey pietra serena. Like many of his projects, San Marco was constructed with incredible rapidity. Unlike Brunelleschi, Michelozzo was able to finish what he started, largely due to Michelozzo's efficiency and due to the availability of adequate financing from Cosimo throughout the campaign.

The first part undertaken by Michelozzo was "the rebuilding of the old refectory, where a low vault, supported by consoles much like those in the sacristy at S. Trinita, was built to sustain the cells above. Work began on the church in 1438 and was probably completed three years later, though certainly by 1443 when it was consecrated by Pope Eugene. Using the perimeter of the former Trecento church, Michelozzo added a polygonal apse, similar in form to that at Bosco ai Frati; it was lighted by three long round arch pietra serena windows which can still be seen in the upper story of the convent. The pointed entrance arch rested on two pilasters with large, classical Corinthian capitals surmounted by a dado decorated with the Medici balls (also still visible). In front of the apse was the Capella Maggiore, covered with groin vaulting. The nave was a single open space without aisles, adorned with ediculas or altars (three on each side), and covered with a wooden beamed ceiling. Separating the nave and the Cappella Maggiore was a high wall (tramezzo) with two doors. In the later remodelling of the church, the wall was removed and the doors were transferred to the polygonal apse where they are now located. Their fluted pilasters are crowned with composite capitals identical to those in the Barbadori Chapel in S. Felicita by Brunelleschi, and above the architrave with classical mouldings, the frieze is decorated, like the capitals at Bosco ai Frati, with the Medici balls."

=== Choir of the Santissima Annunziata ===
Commissioned by Lodovico Gonzaga, lord of Mantua and general of the Florentine troops, the choir was created in commemoration of Gonzaga's father and "for the celebration of masses for his soul." Cosimo had already commissioned Michelozzo with the construction of the church's vestibulum and atrium in order to continue Brunelleschi's idea of a forum all'antica. In designing the Santissima Annunziata, Michelozzo followed the model of the Minerva Medica in Rome, making the inner plan round, creating a dome that was as hemispheric the Pantheon, and detailing it with a ten-sided exterior with deep, over-semicircular chapels. He also opted for a drum and a dome without ribs. Though the Santissima Annunziata was Michelozzo's attempt to surpass Brunelleschi on his ground, "a comparison of the two ground plans suffices to show how utterly superior Brunelleschi's is."

=== Santa Croce ===
In the May 1966 issue of The Burlington Magazine, Howard Saalman wrote that "the language of the details of the Ex-Dormitory and the Ex-Library wing points to Michelozzo. If Vasari is right and Michelozzo did work at Santa Croce (and there is no reason to doubt it in spite of the lack of documentation) then Michelozzo and his circle probably handled the entire operation as at San Marco, SS. Annunziata and elsewhere."

Michelozzo added various parts to the church and cloister of Santa Croce, including "the loggia in front of the Ex-Dormitory and Library (octagonal columns with foglie d'acqua capitals) which originally extended across the cloister to the elevated loggia on the south side of the church, running along the eastern flank of the San Giuliano (Mellini) Chapel...which divided the first cloister into two parts before its destruction in the nineteenth century." Additionally, the Cerchi Chapel on "the ground floor of the Ex-Library wing at the end adjacent to the Ex-Refectory is evidently inserted into older peripheral walls which survived the 1423 fire. The language of the details (pilasters flanking the opening into the little square choir, capitals of the lunette vaults of the hall in front of the choir – which overlap older windows in the side walls) is that of the Michelozzo circle."

=== Other notable works ===
From 1461 through 1464, he constructed the Walls of Ston in Ragusa, the largest medieval wall in Europe.

== Death and legacy ==
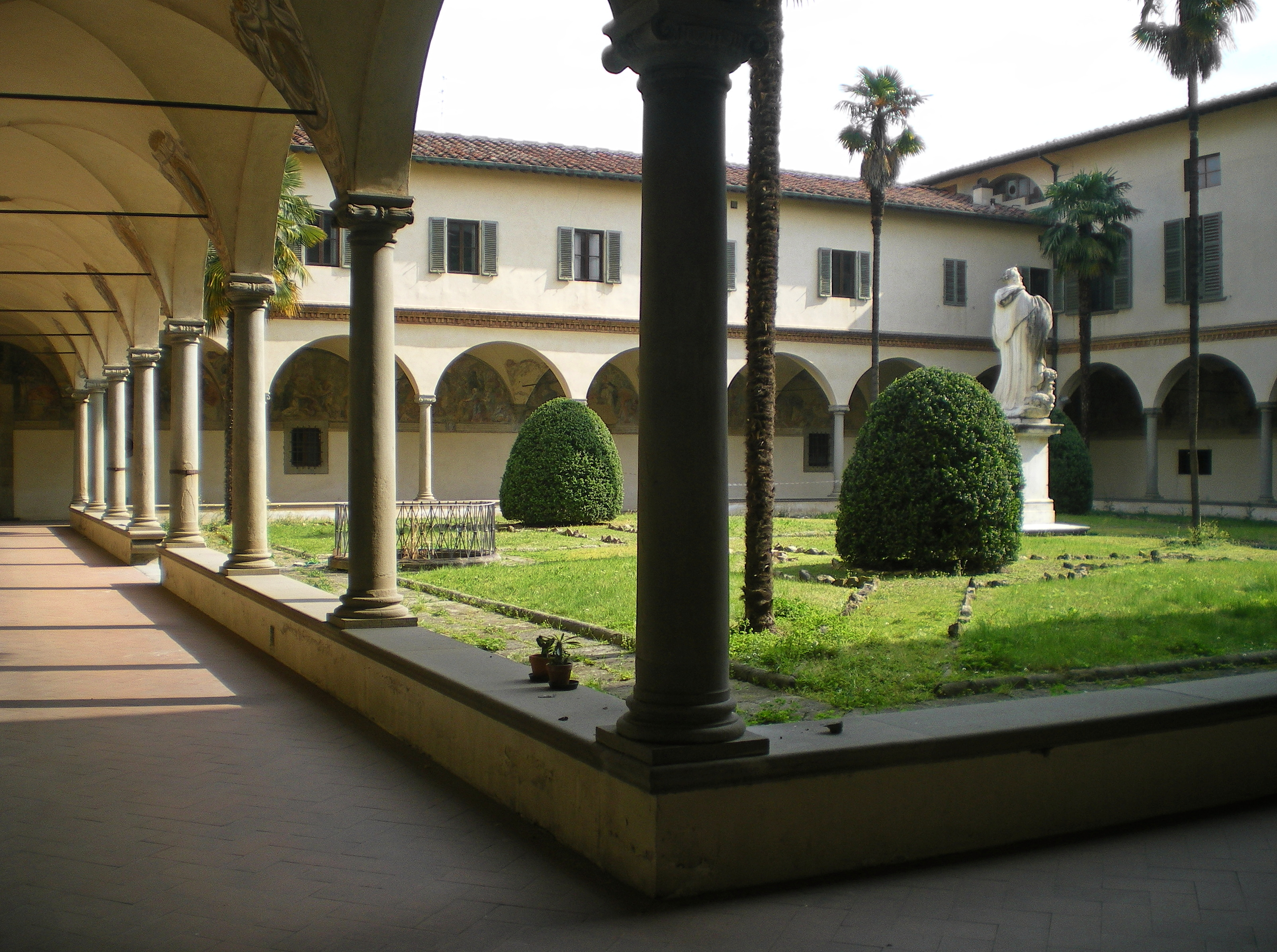
Cloister of San Marco in Florence

In spite of Vasari's statement that he died at the age of sixty-eight, he appears to have lived until 1472. He is buried in the monastery of San Marco, Florence.

One of the most influential, yet unknown, architects of the Early Renaissance, Michelozzo's designs paved the way for the rapid development of the Central Italian Palazzo type. He developed the aisleless church and became the pioneer of a plan-type of sacred building, which is the most important in modern times. He transformed secular building and his adaptability in use of traditional forms enabled him to evolve good compromise solutions for distant regions, such as Lombardy and Dalmatia.

In his careful treatment of architectural ornament, "Michelozzo was able to adopt ideas and turn them to good account as well as to transmit new ones. The styles of Manetti, Bernardo Rossellino, Giuliano da Maiano, and even of Giuliano da Sangallo are unimaginable without the support and influence of Michelozzo's artistic idiom in addition to that of Brunelleschi, and later, of Donatello."

== See also ==
- Tomb of Antipope John XXIII
- Tomb of Cardinal Rainaldo Brancacci
- Walls of Dubrovnik
- Palazzo dello Strozzino
- San Girolamo, Volterra
- Villa San Girolamo
