= San Girolamo, Volterra =

Church and Convent in Volterra, Italy

San Girolamo
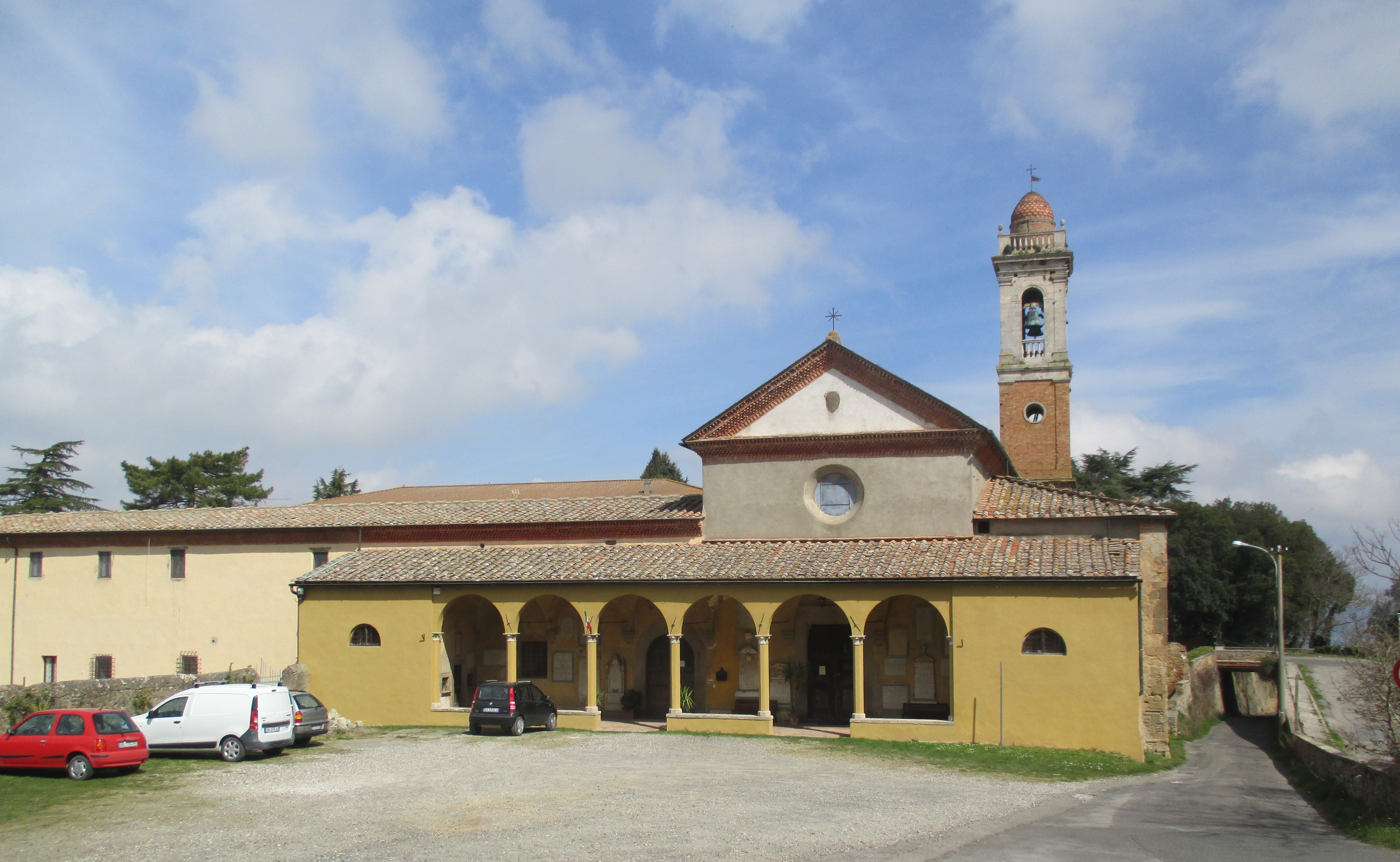

Religion
- Affiliation: Roman Catholic
- Province: Pisa

Location
- Location: Volterra, Italy
- Interactive map of San Girolamo
- Coordinates: 43.40349°N 10.87395°E

Architecture
- Type: Church
- Style: Renaissance

San Girolamo is a Renaissance-style Roman Catholic church located just outside the old walled city of Volterra, Italy. The church and attached Franciscan convent, a complex also known as of San Girolamo al Vellosoli, were designed by Michelozzo and construction was completed by about 1445. Some have questioned the attribution and even suggested that it was designed by another famous Florentine architect, Lorenzo Ghiberti.

Among its patrons was the Duke Cosimo de' Medici from Florence. The long portico in front of the church has similarities to another Michelozzo work, the church and convent of Bosco ai Frati in San Piero a Sieve.

The facade has a long asymmetric portico leading to two chapels. Each contain terracotta reliefs by Giovanni della Robbia depicting St Francis of Assisi consigns the third order to St Louis of France and St Elizabeth of Hungary and the Last Judgement (1501).

The main altar is flanked by two paintings: an Annunciation by Benvenuto di Giovanni, and a Madonna and Child with Saints by Domenico di Michelino. An interior chapel has an Immaculate Conception by Santi di Tito. The glazed terracotta statues of St Jerome and St Francis are attributed to Giovanni Gonmelli, also called il Cieco di Gambassi (blind man of Gambassi).

The adjacent convent is now a youth hostel and hotel.

== Sources ==
- Hall Information
