= Andrea di Niccolò =

Italian painter

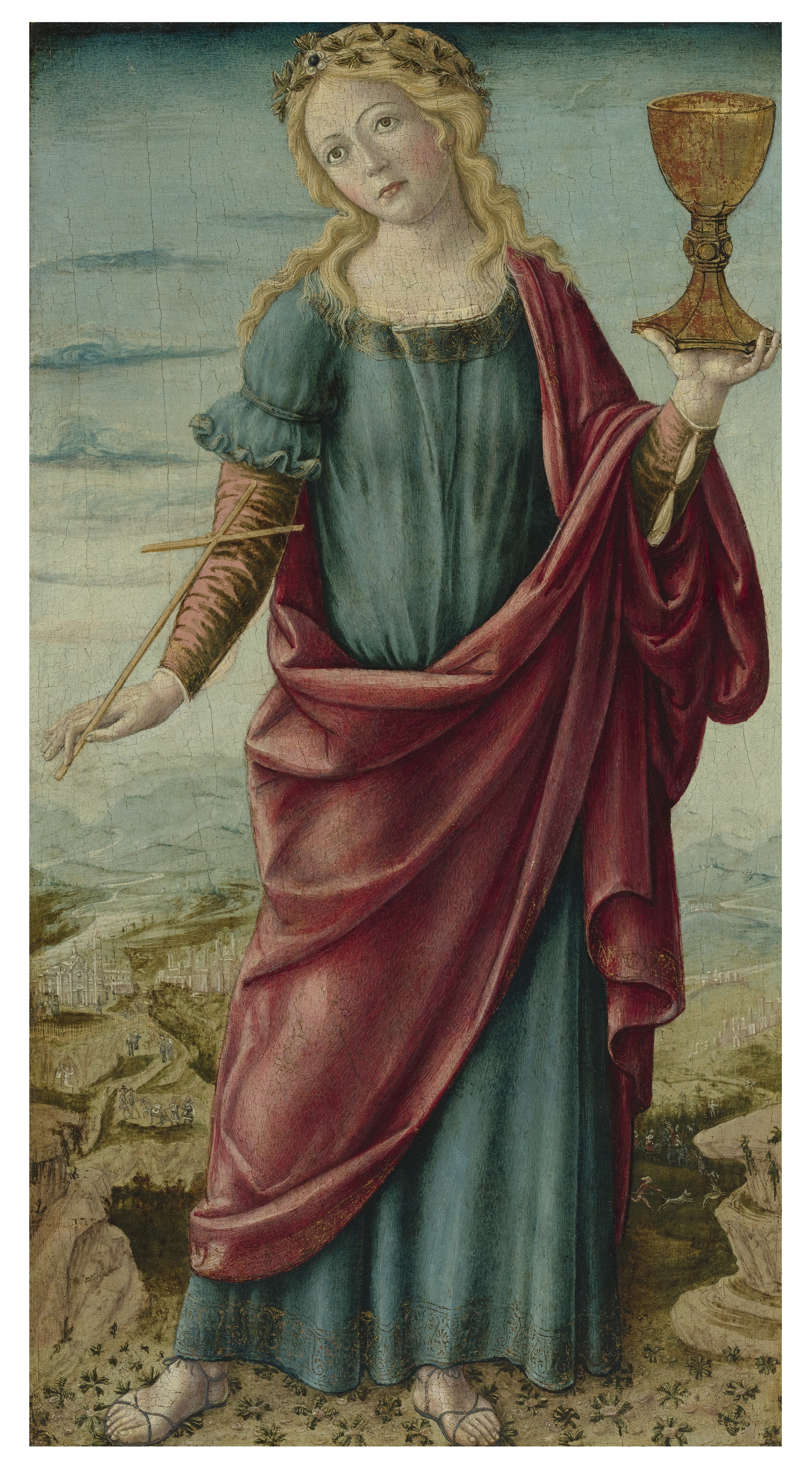
Faith by Andrea di Niccolò, Gallery Wildenstein (New York), between 1495–1500

Andrea di Niccolò, also Andrea di Niccolò di Giacomo, (1440–1514) was an Italian painter of the Sienese School.

== Life ==
Andrea di Niccolò was an artist from Siena. Archival documents reveal in 1469 he married Angelica di Francesco di Michele, and in 1470 he collaborated with Giovanni di Paolo on some works for Santa Maria della Scala (Siena), and in that same year worked on creating a tabernacle for Oratorio della Campania in San Bernardino. In the year 1477 he frescoed additional works in this Oratorio with scenes of the life of Saint Lucy. Andrea di Niccolò worked primarily around Siena and its surrounding towns. The art scholar Bernard Berenson noted Andrea was a pupil of Vecchietta, and demonstrated influences of Matteo di Giovanni and Pietro Perugino.

== Works ==
The museum Pinacoteca Nazionale (Siena) has his painting Madonna and Child with Four Saints, and has the signature and date (circa 1500). His brush has also been attributed to a few typical Sienese Madonna with Saints, preserved in private collections. One of his most famous works is in the parish church of Santa Maria Assunta (Assumption of Mary) in the small village of Casole d'Elsa near Siena. This altarpiece with arc-shaped pinnacles and predella, was painted by the artist in 1498. On it is a signature of Andrea. In the upper part, he portrayed Massacre of the Innocents, clearly inspired by the work of Matteo di Giovanni, and in the middle of the Madonna with Child and Saints.

Themes of works by Andrea di Niccolò was almost entirely religious. Other works of his include:

- Virgin and Child between Saint Jerome and Saint Peter (1500, Fitzwilliam Museum, England)
- The Crucifixion (1502, Pinacoteca Nazionale, Siena)
- Madonna and Child with John the Baptist and St. Jerome (Siena County Museum of Religious Art)
- Madonna and Child with Angels and Saints (1504, Museum of Art, Cincinnati, USA)
- Madonna and Child with Saints (1510, Mustola Santa delle Rose, Siena)
- Mass of Gregory (Paris, Bonn collection)

He also painted works which depict an allegorical figure of the Faith and Mercy. It was a series, consisting of three parts (the third painting of Hope, kept in a private collection in England). Similar series depicting allegorical figures symbolizing the human virtues, in the second half of the 15th century became very popular. The purpose of this series is not entirely clear; experts suggest that it may have been created to decorate a sacristy. The last work of the artist were the frescoes in the church of Santa Maria and Pyantasala in a small town Kashyano di Muro at Siena, started in 1514.

== Gallery ==
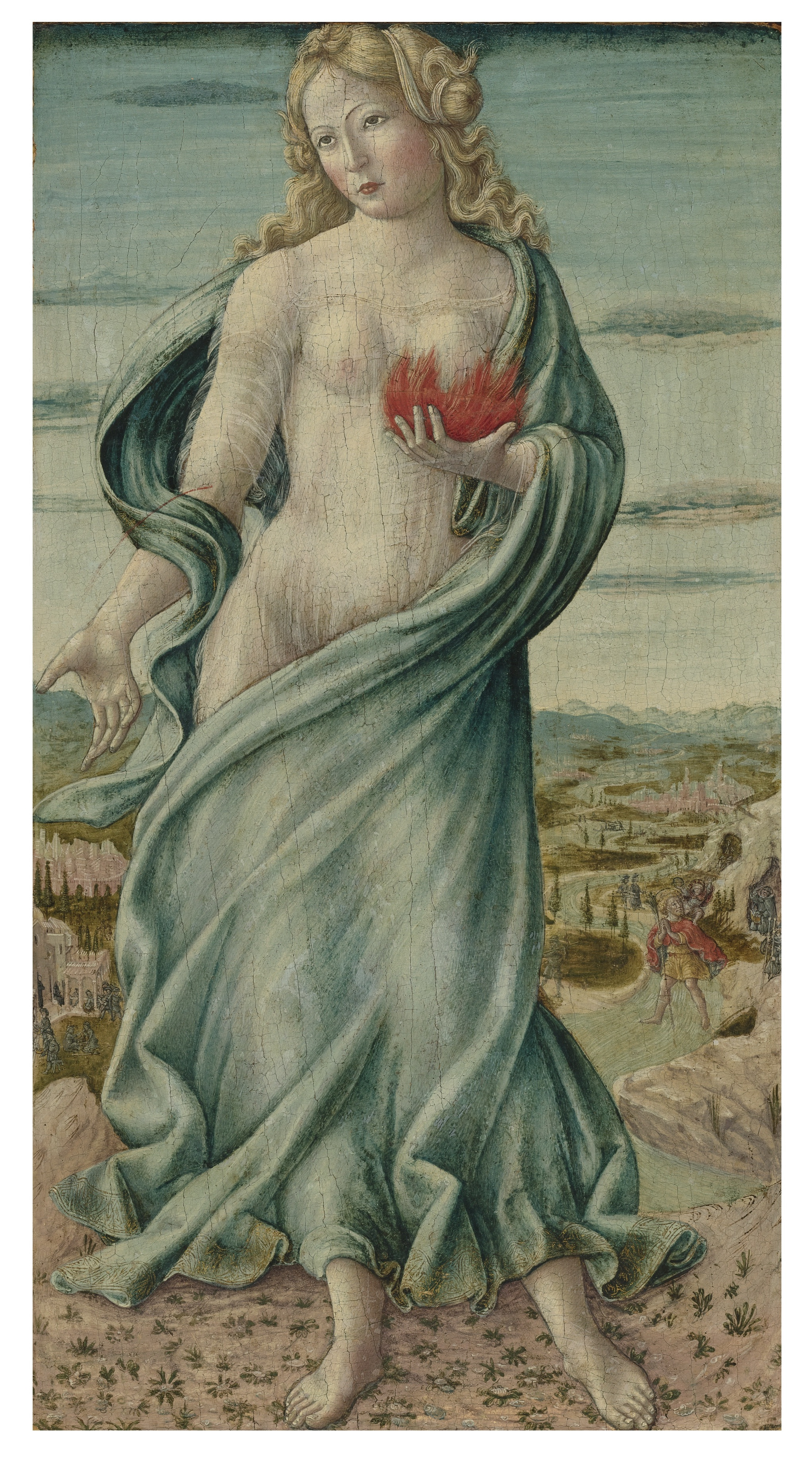
Charity, c. 1495-1500

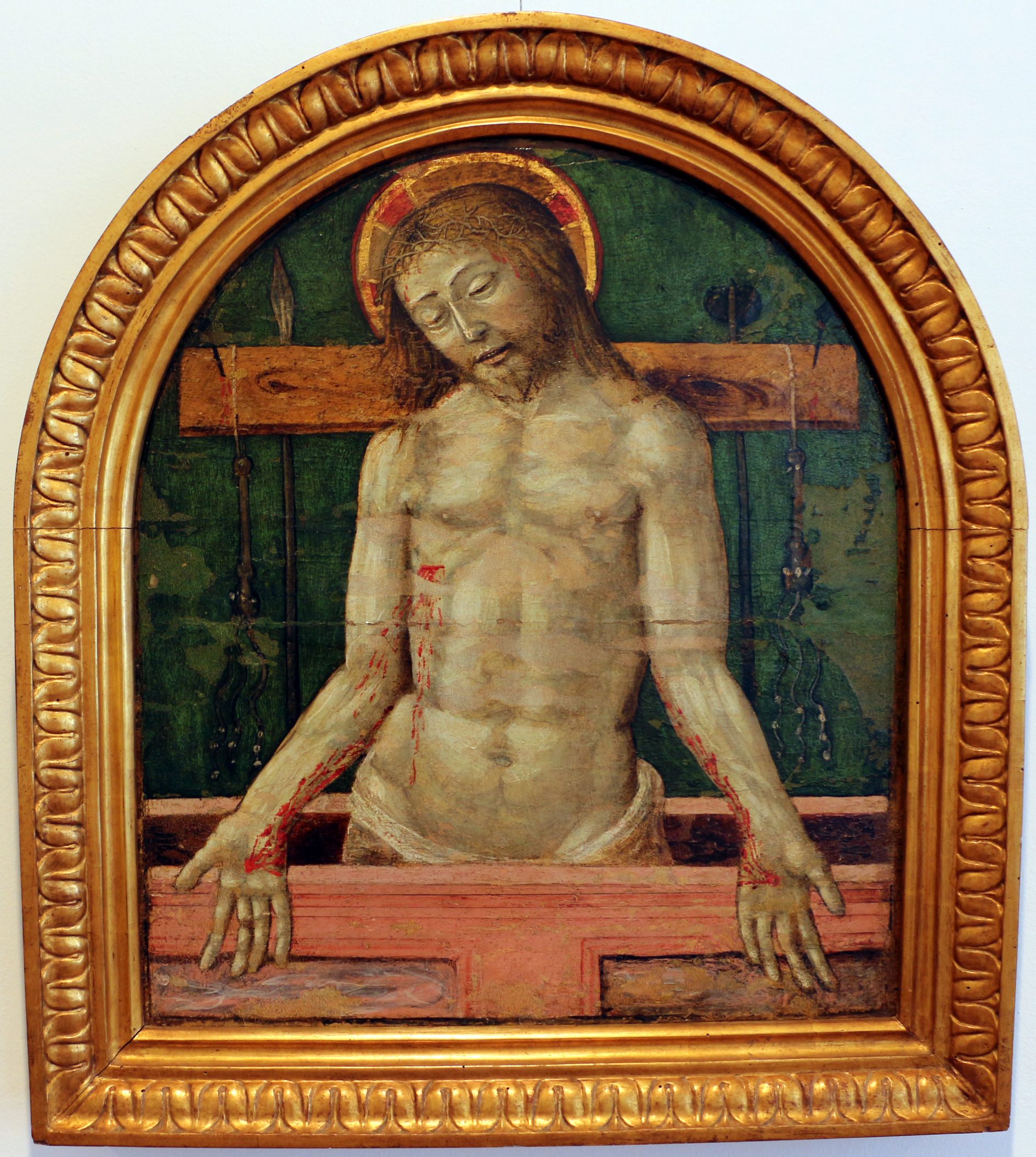
Pieta, c. 1490

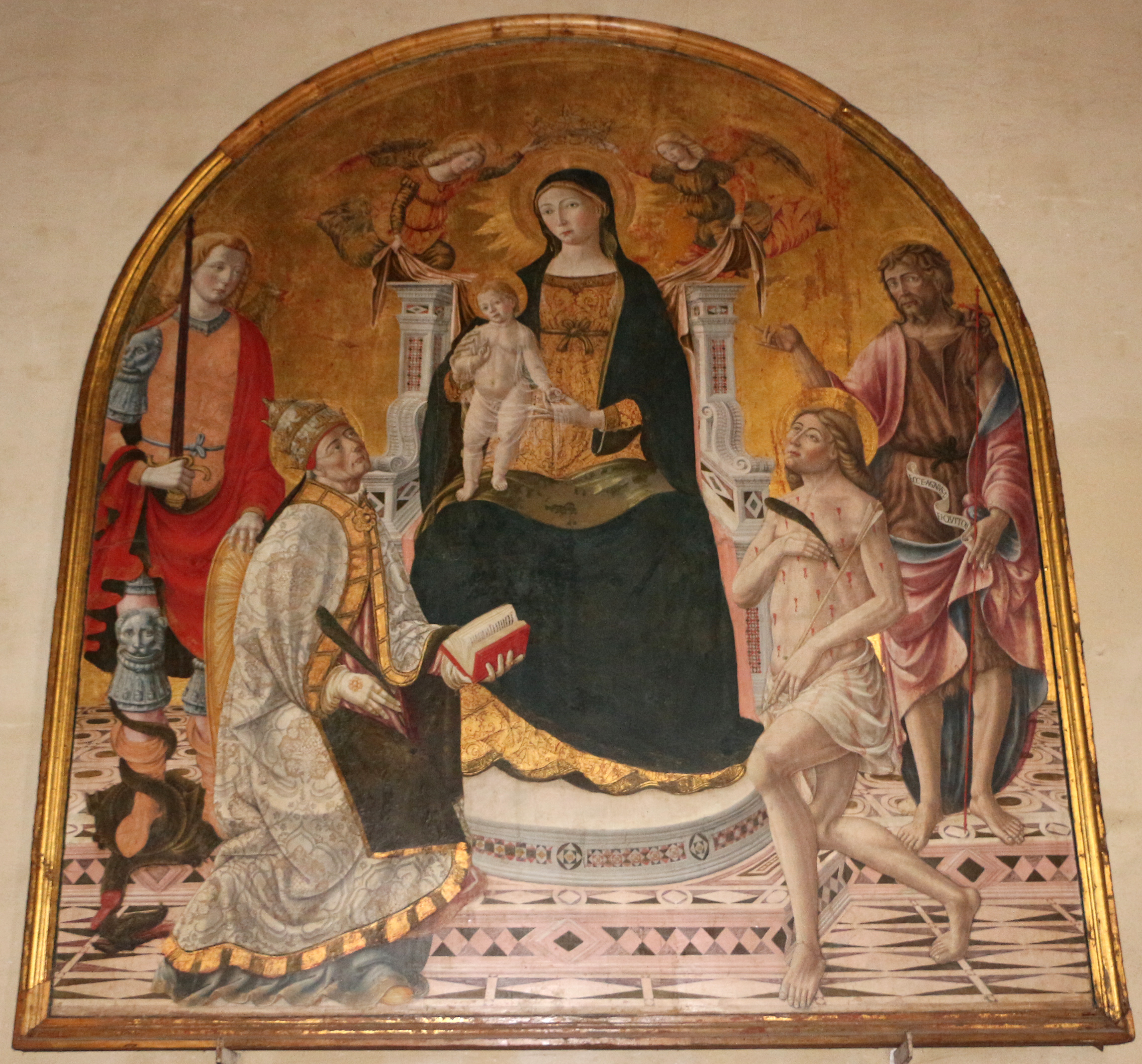
Madonna and Child with Saints
