= Pietro di Francesco degli Orioli =

Italian painter

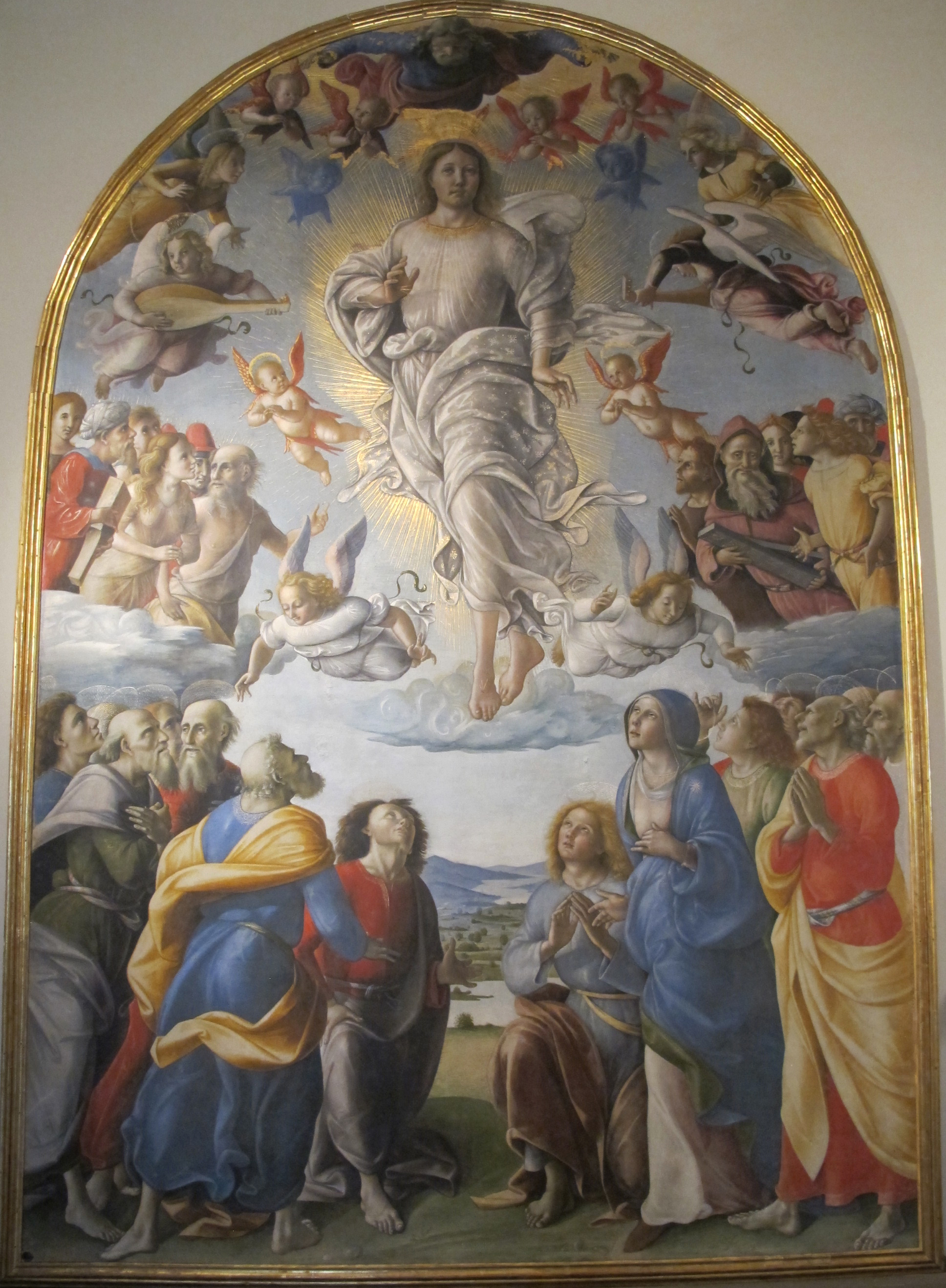
The Ascension, Chiesa dall'Osservanza, Siena

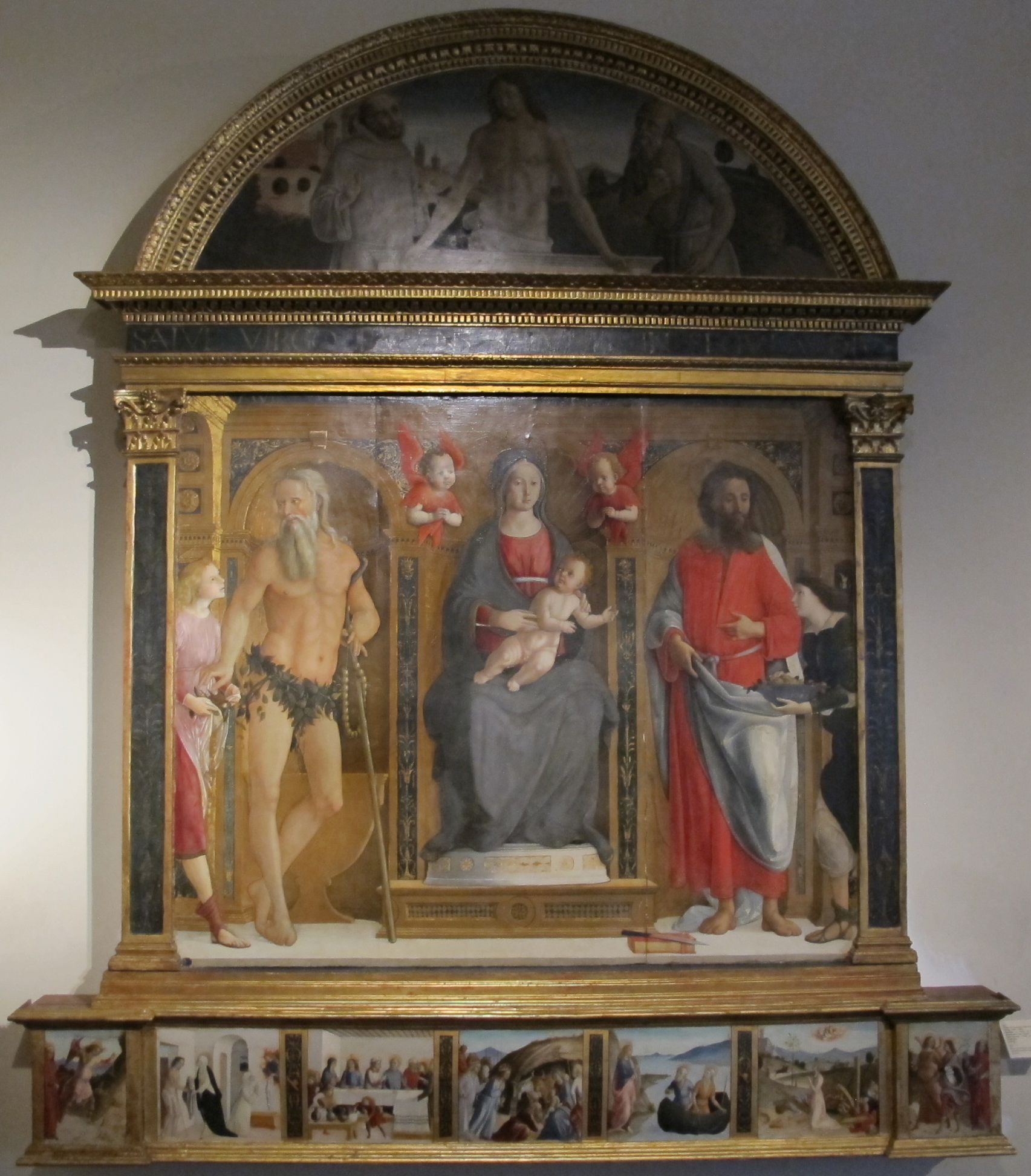
Madonna and Child with Saints, Pinacoteca Nazionale, Siena

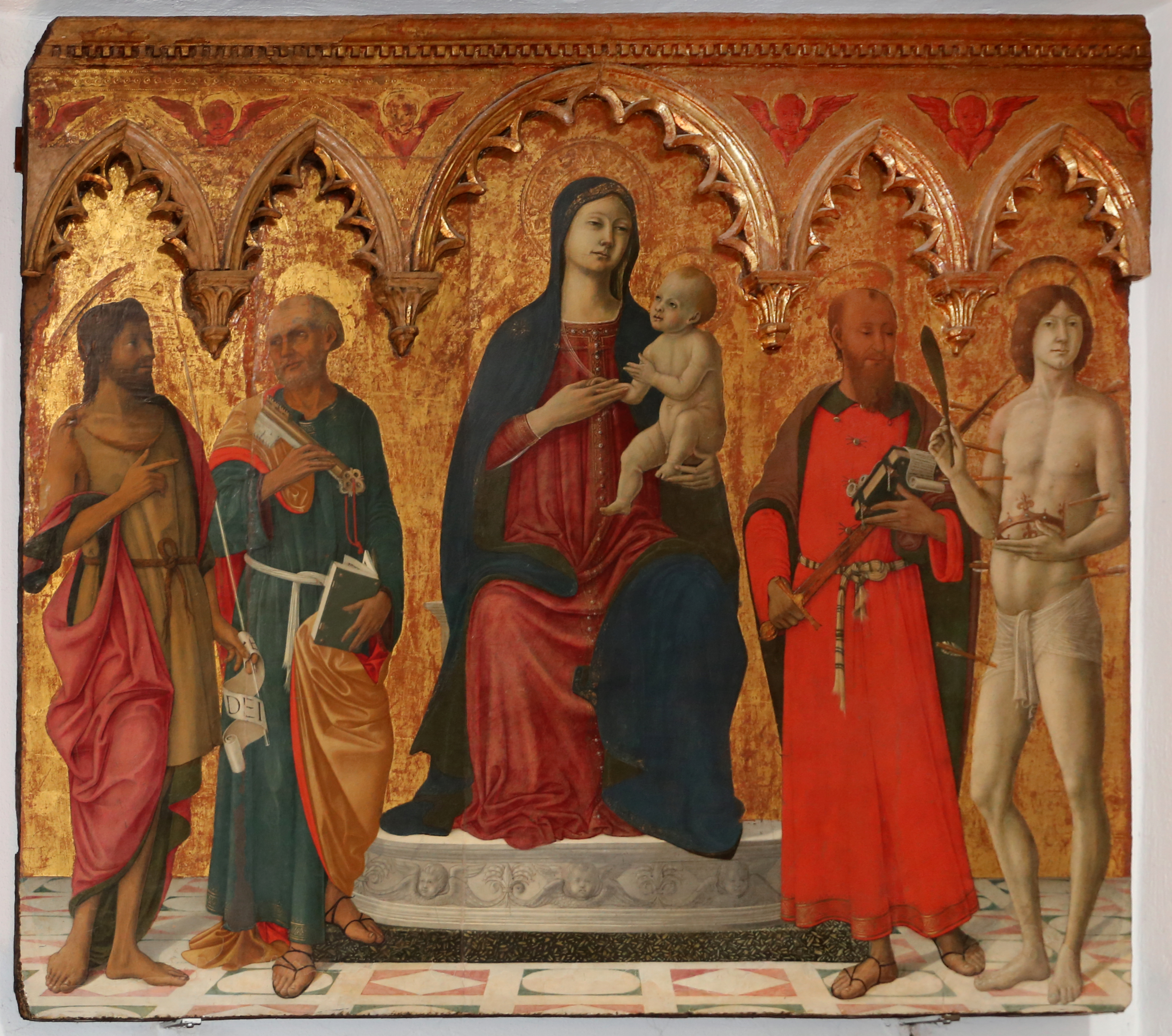
Madonna and Child with Saints, Church of Saints Peter and Paul, Buonconvento, (Siena)

Pietro di Francesco degli Orioli (approx. 1458–1496) was an Italian painter of the Renaissance period.

== Biography ==
Pietro Orioli was born in Siena in Tuscany. The art of Siena has previously been celebrated primarily for its late medieval masters such as Duccio, Simone Martini, as well as Ambrogio and Pietro Lorenzetti; Orioli arose in the next century, and the art in Siena of this period has been generally overshadowed by the art of Florentine masters of the Quattrocento.

In 1458 the Sienese cardinal Aeneas Sylvius Piccolomini was elected as Pope Pius II. The period between this date and the end of the Sienese republic in 1558 saw the development of a unique style of art from the city state, showing tendencies towards some of the more ethereal properties of the golden age of Sienese art rather than the studied realism and veneration of classical aesthetics and principles which drove many artists within the more celebrated centres of Florence, Rome and Venice. The artistic development along the line of more international Gothic styles would have meant that these more famous artistic schools would probably have considered contemporary Sienese art somewhat archaic and unfashionable.

Orioli had a relatively short artistic career (he died aged 37, and was only active independently from 1480), but his work is nonetheless important in the context of Sienese art. He was a pupil of the painter Matteo di Giovanni who was very much a product of the quattrocento Sienese school. He is also known to have worked with the celebrated Francesco di Giorgio, a painter, sculptor and former pupil of probably the most famous Sienese sculptor of the period Il Vecchietta. It is therefore possible to deduce that Orioli was active within a circle of quintessentially Sienese artists.

His first documented work is Christ Washing the Feet of the Apostles (1489), found in the Baptistry in Siena. Other important works include Madonna and Child with Saint Jerome and a Female Saint (c. 1490), a Nativity (c. 1494–96), and an Adoration of the Shepherds dating to the last part of his career.

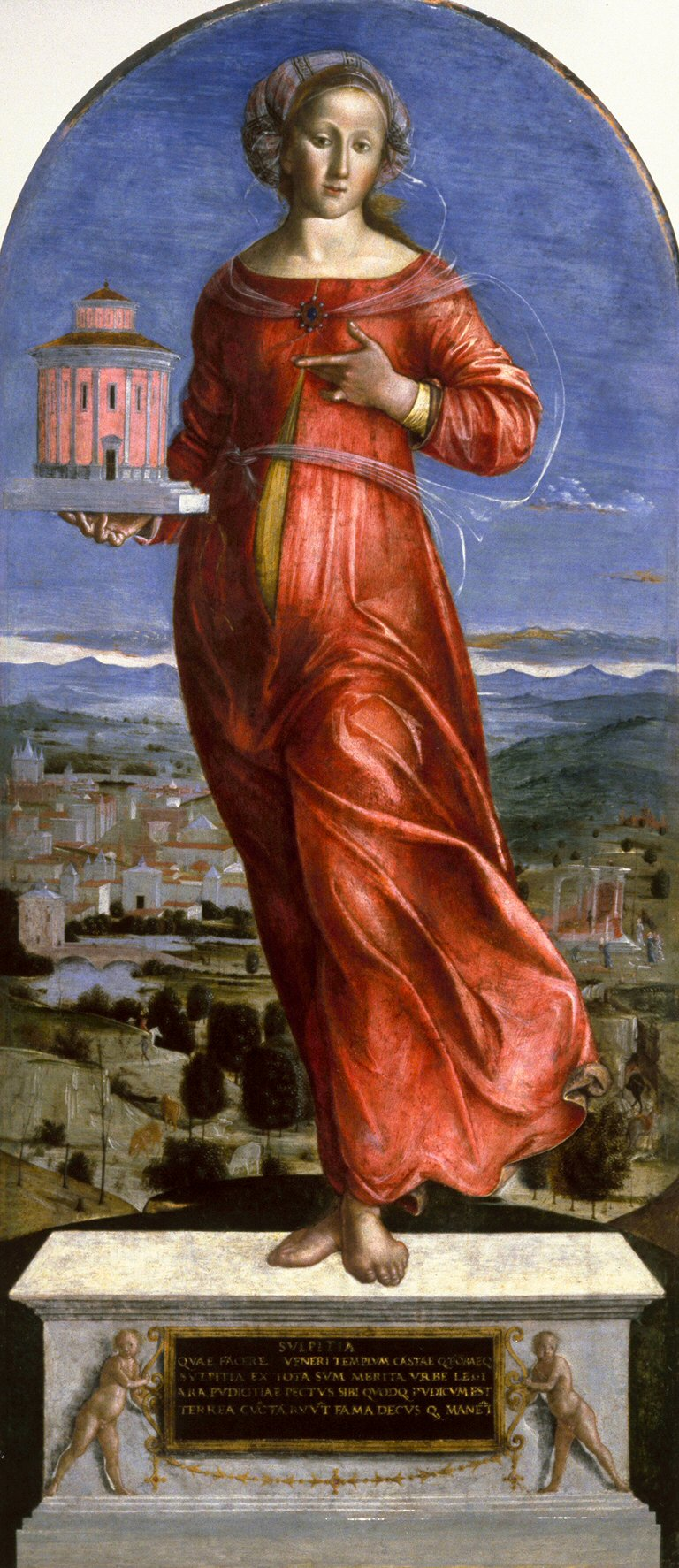
Painting by Orioli depicting Sulpicia, who was chosen in the 3rd century BC as the most worthy woman in Rome to dedicate a statue to the goddess Venus Verticordia. Walters Art Museum

Stylistically, Orioli's work seems to related be to that of his Florentine contemporary, Botticelli. His painting can similarly be described as 'non-realist'. He uses pale hatching unrelated to the landscape or architecture to reinforce the contours of his figures in a way that is similar to Botticelli's St Zenobius panels in the National Gallery, London. Botticelli in fact uses this device later than Orioli, suggesting that either the two knew each other, or Botticelli regarded the Sienese artist very highly. Orioli's works, though very much a part of his city's artistic school, also show some more Florentine traits. His figures have a characteristically Sienese mystical quality, but also show a careful adherence to the rules of human anatomy and perspective. This can be seen most obviously in his c.1493 work Sulpitia. This was part of a series of panels, the others being Judith by Matteo di Giovanni, Artemisia by the Master of the story of Griselda and Claudia Quinta by Neroccio di Landi and the Master of the Story of Griselda (all Sienese). Whilst the latter paintings show varying degrees of success in presenting their characters realistically on painted plinths, Orioli's stands much more believably. Furthermore, when seen together Orioli's figure has a dramatic, fulsome quality, with a naturalistic pose compared to the other figures which are demonstrably within the Gothic tradition of awkward, stylised poses.

Orioli was stylistic similar to the contemporaries operating within his home city, as well as being related to the highly celebrated Florentine Botticelli, who he may have influenced. His work differs from that of some of his kinsmen, however, in showing what would have been seen by those outside Siena as a more modern approach. Among his followers would be Pietro di Domenico Petrini.
