= Signorelli =

Signorelli is a surname. Notable people with the surname include:

- Franco Signorelli (born 1991), Venezuelan footballer
- Frank Signorelli (1901–1975), American jazz pianist
- James Signorelli, American film director and cinematographer
- Luca Signorelli (c. 1445–1523), Italian Renaissance painter
- Marcelo Signorelli (born 1963), Italian-Uruguayan basketball player, coach, and author
- Maria Signorelli (1908–1992), Italian puppet master and collector
- Paolo Signorelli (politician) (1934–2010), Italian activist and politician
- Paolo Signorelli (footballer) (1939–2018), Italian footballer
- Pietro Napoli Signorelli (1731–1815), Italian scholar of classic literature
- Vincent Signorelli, American punk-rock drummer
