= Benvenuto di Giovanni =

Italian painter

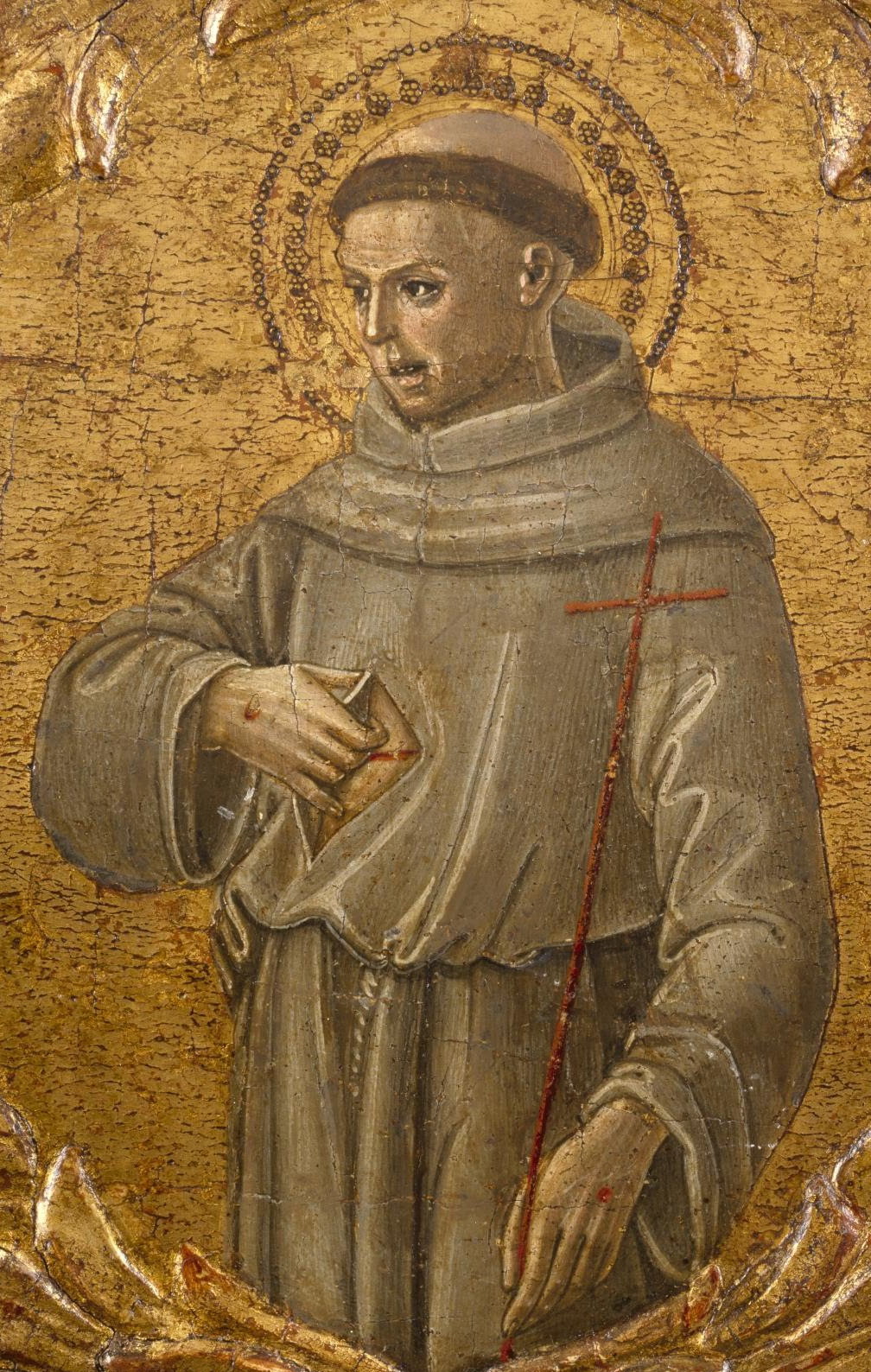
St Francis of Assisi, c. 1475–1478

Benvenuto di Giovanni (13 September 1436 – c. 1518), also known as Benvenuto di Giovanni di Meo del Guasta, was an Italian painter and artist known for his choral miniatures, pavement designs, and frescoes. Working chiefly in Siena, he was first recognized to be working as an artist in 1453 and continued his work nearly until his death in approximately 1518. During his lifetime, he was influenced by various artists and in the 1480s, Benvenuto's style changed drastically.

Though Benvenuto did explore other fields of work, painting was consistently a part of his life. His son, Girolamo di Giovanni, followed in his footsteps and also became a painter. In fact, there have often been instances of the work of one of the two being confused for that of the other. Nevertheless, Benvenuto left behind significantly more works. Some of his works were both signed and dated, some were only signed, and some only dated. However, regardless of debate over date or authorship, Benvenuto left behind a significant number of works, both ones that are quite well known as well as others that are more minor in their distinction. His pieces that are signed, dated, and still existing have dates spanning a period of 43 years. In addition to the works that he left behind, he also left behind a legacy through the artists that he influenced during his lifetime.

== Life and influences ==
Born to a bricklayer in Siena, Benvenuto remained there for his entire life, only occasionally venturing to nearby cities for his work. The first records of him as an artist are of his contributions to the Siena Baptistery in 1453. His work here was likely in collaboration with il Vecchietta, as it is believed that Benvenuto was trained in his workshop. Outside of Vecchietta, Benvenuto was also likely to have worked under Sano di Pietro because they share a number of similarities stylistically.

Benvenuto was commissioned to do a number of works in the Siena Cathedral during his life that included choral miniatures, pavement designs, and frescoes. However, he was not the only artist requested to work in the cathedral; artists and painters such as Matteo di Giovanni, Francesco di Giorgio Martini, and Neroccio di Bartolomeo de' Landi were also commissioned, or hired, for nearly the same jobs. This commonality led to Benvenuto and the other artists having a significant amount of influence upon one another's style.

Other painters that had works in the Siena Cathedral were Liberale da Verona and Girolamo da Cremona. What sets these artists apart is that it is believed that their pieces in the cathedral were what led to Benvenuto's great shift in style in the 1480s. In 1482, he was commissioned to paint Donation of the Keys to St. Peter in the Antiphonary of the Birth of St. John. It was at this time that he saw Liberale and Girolamo's recent works in the cathedral that incorporated bright colors and manipulated light. As a result of this, he began to do the same in his paintings. Additionally, not only did his style shift in this way, but he also began to experiment with the concept of spatial distortion that was common in paintings by Vecchietta and Donatello. He used a very naturalistic style for his figures, but paired them with a brightly colored and sharply lit background. The combination of his efforts to depict realistic figures, to strategically utilize colors, and to manipulate space in order to give his paintings depth led to a style that was both distinct and uniquely his. These shifts in his style can be seen in paintings such as Maestà and Ascension.

Outside of painting, Benvenuto also explored other personal endeavors. In 1466, he married Jacopa di Tommaso de Cetona. After their marriage, he served at least two terms in a public office. Together, they owned a vineyard and also had seven children. The only child that much is known about is Girolamo, as he was Benvenuto's only follower. However, Girolamo is regarded as both less gifted and less influential, largely because he only survived his father by six years.

== Major works ==
=== Annunciation ===
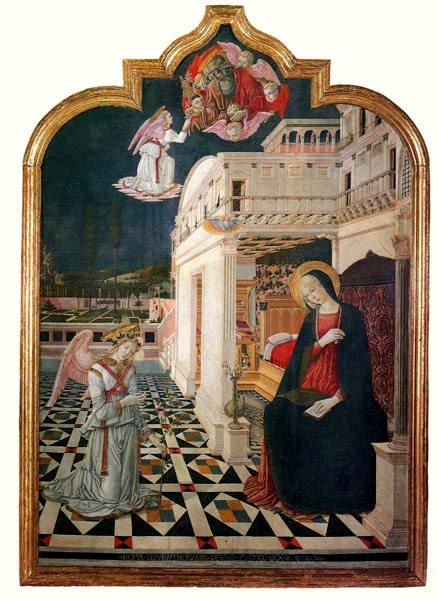
Annunciation, 1470

It is known that Benvenuto painted at least two versions of the Annunciation. His first Annunciation is the earliest known painting by him, dated in 1466. Despite this being his first work, there was little evidence of the influence of his teacher, Vecchietta. Rather, this work was very clearly inspired by Simone Martini's 1333 painting of the same name. Many other Annunciation works by other artists during Benvenuto's lifetime used landscapes and backgrounds, but Benvenuto employed a more simple gold ground that was typical in works of the early Trecento. Benvenuto's 1466 version resides in the church of St. Girolamo in Volterra.

Benvenuto's growth as an artist is evident through comparison of his 1466 Annunciation with his 1470 version. In 1466, Benvenuto opted for a more subtle coloration in his work. However, in 1470, while many of his contemporaries still utilized softer palettes, Benvenuto chose to paint with rich, deep colors that pleased the viewer's eye. This shift in style is likely to have been inspired by two artists that were quite famous during the latter part of the Quattrocento, Girolamo da Cremona and Liberale da Verona. Additionally, Benvenuto traded in his previous flat gold background for one of detailed scenery, including lush gardens, mountains, and lakes.

=== Expulsion from Paradise ===
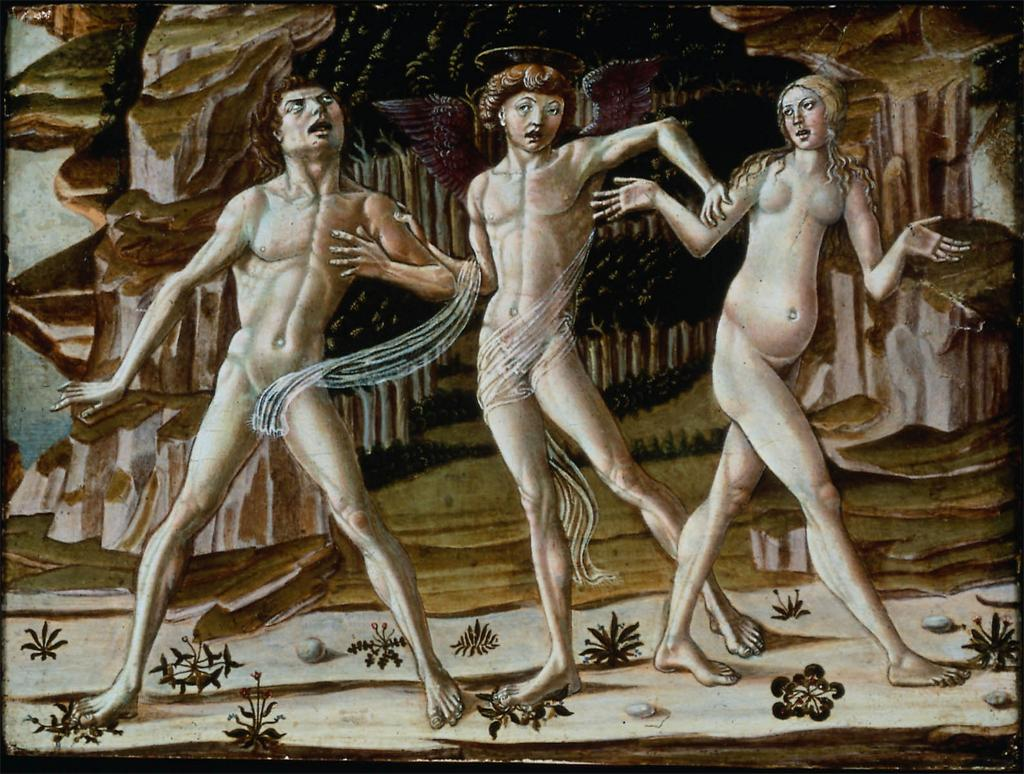
Expulsion from Paradise, 1470s

This painting, done by many artists, depicts Adam and Eve being cast out of the Garden of Eden by the archangel, Jophiel. However, Benvenuto's version stands out from the others because his depiction of Eden is far more realistic than that of other artists. He paints Eden as a lush green forest rather than a land full of a myriad of plants and animals. He expertly constructs the figures in a way that makes the subjects come alive through the intermingling of their arms and angling of their bodies. Most likely painted between 1480 and 1500, this exhibits Benvenuto's later style that combines realistic backgrounds and dramatic subjects.

At this time, nothing is known of this painting's provenance, or ownership, before 1921, when it became a part of the Engel-Gros Collection. In fact, even the validity of who may be the artist of this painting underwent speculation. Expulsion from Paradise is unsigned and was originally attributed to Benvenuto's son, Girolamo. The credit continued to be given to his son for quite a while, until it was also given to Cosimo Tura, and then finally to Benvenuto, which was settled upon by art historians.

Despite the credit eventually being given to Benvenuto, it is likely that this confusion arose in the first place due to their probable collaboration on the piece. Towards the end of his life, Benvenuto regularly worked with his son, which this piece seems to exhibit. The design itself appears to be Benvenuto's, but certain aspects point towards the assistance of his son. The details of the figures' faces, as well as their shaping, is in a style that is typical of Girolamo.

== Minor works ==
=== The Adoration of the Magi ===
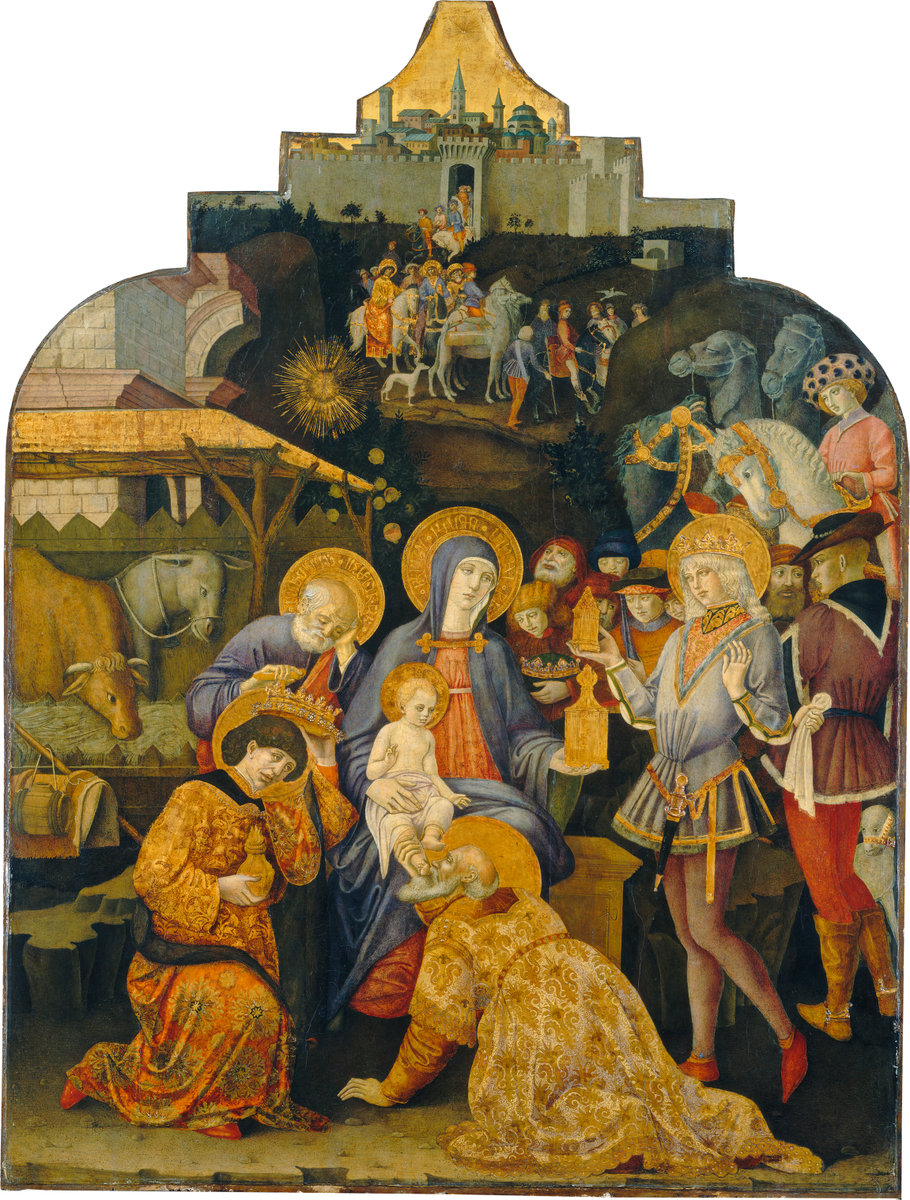
The Adoration of the Magi, c.1470/1475

This theme is one that has been depicted in Italian paintings since the Middle Ages, but it became particularly popular with Sienese painters after Bartolo di Fredi created his triptych to decorate the altar of the Three Kings in the Siena Cathedral. After this creation, Bartolo's influence began to be seen in nearly every Sienese painting of the same theme, including Benvenuto's. However, the influence of other artists is evident as well. It is believed that Benvenuto's version was inspired by Gentile da Fabriano's 1423 version that was commissioned by the Church of Santa Trinità.

Benvenuto's work now resides in the National Gallery of Art in Washington, D.C., but is currently not on exhibit. The date of the painting is unknown, with estimates ranging from 1460 to 1490. The difficulty in deciphering the date largely comes from the wear on the work, with most of the original painting being now covered by retouches. Nevertheless, when compared to Bevenuto's dated pieces, many art historians are convinced that it was completed between 1470 and 1475. This conclusion is a result of the perspective of the painting, or the way in which the flat painting is made to seem three-dimensional. Much like his 1470 Annunciation, the apparent vanishing point of the painting is lower than the horizon of the background would suggest.

=== Madonna and Child with Saint Jerome and Saint Bernardino of Siena ===
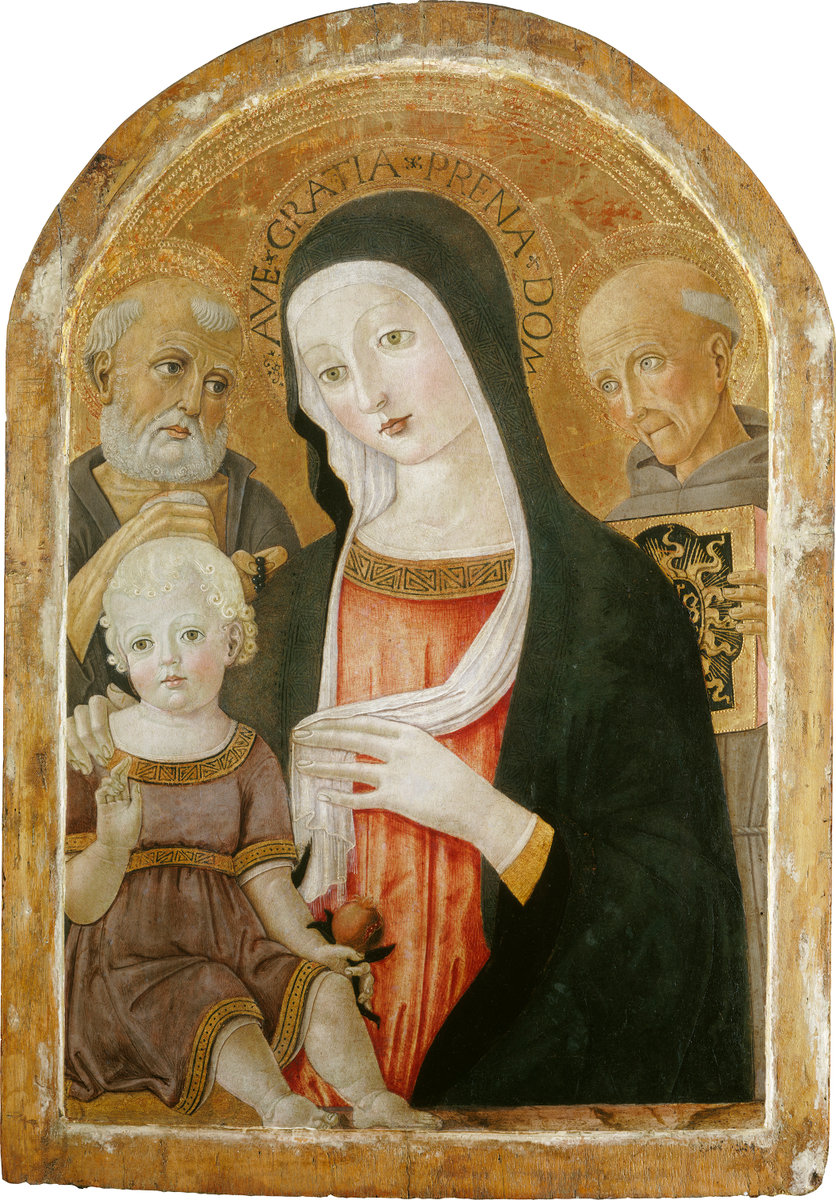
Madonna and Child with Saint Jerome and Saint Bernardino of Siena, c. 1480/1485

Unlike many of Benvenuto's works, this one in particular has consistently been attributed to him without any confusion. Nevertheless, its date is still unclear. In most paintings of this theme, Madonna's child is held in her arms, but Benvenuto depicts him seated in front of her. The child is holding a pomegranate that is representative of both the Church and the blood of Christ. The choice to not place the child in Madonna's arms as well as the inclusion of the pomegranate are both artistic decisions that don't appear in Italian paintings until significantly after 1470, thus, the painting's date has been approximated as c. 1480/1485.

Much of the confusion with the date of this painting revolves around the fact that it doesn't quite fall into either Benvenuto's early, flat and crisp, style or his later, brightly colored and more detailed, style. It is far simpler than nearly all of his paintings, likely due to his patron's request. Recently, the first expressions of doubt of his attribution have surfaced due to this stark contrast. Nevertheless, attribution still lies in Benvenuto's hands.

=== The Crucifixion ===
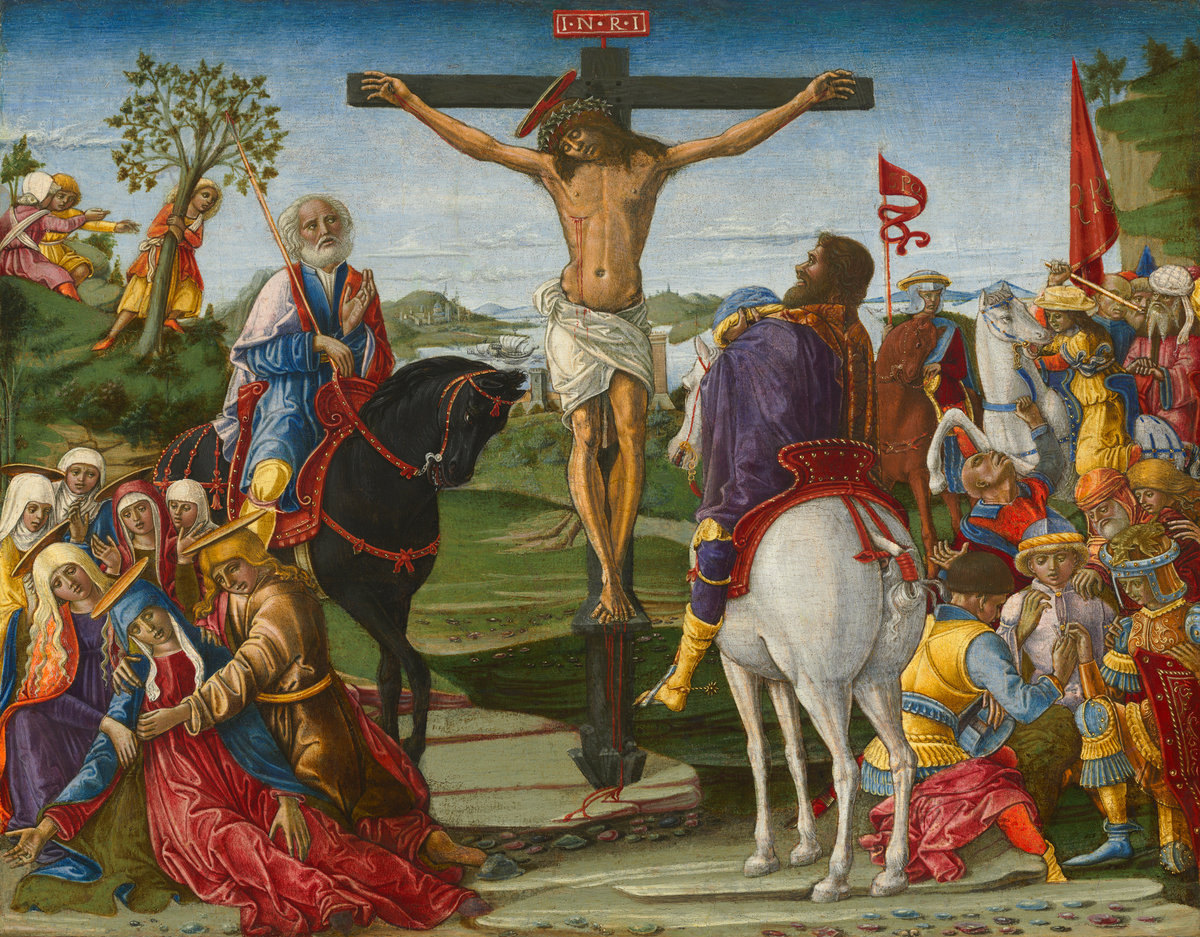
The Crucifixion, c. 1491

Framed alongside four other of his works (Agony in the Garden, The Way to Calvary, The Resurrection, and The Descent into Limbo), this predella set of paintings details the struggles of Christ. It is believed that these paintings were created in or around 1491 due to the similarities in the landscapes of The Crucifixion and Benvenuto's 1491 Ascension. In The Crucifixion, various prominent biblical figures within this story can be seen in Benvenuto's portrayal of the event. Longinus is depicted on horseback slightly behind Christ, holding the spear that he had pierced Christ with earlier. In the bottom left corner of the painting is the Virgin, Saint John, Mary, the mother of James, the Magdalene, and the three holy women. The Virgin is the figure that is fainting and the others are the ones surrounding and supporting her.

Painting the Virgin Mary fainting is an artistic choice that was very common in fourteenth-century Sienese representations of this event. However, what was not common, was Benvenuto's choice to include the children on the hill in the upper left corner. They are, from a distance, pointing towards and spectating the cruelty that is occurring in the center of the painting. This inclusion had never been made before, thus, it exemplified Benvenuto's creativity and inventiveness.

== Extant signed and dated paintings ==
Benvenuto has 11 signed and dated paintings that are still surviving. Their dates of creation span 43 years.

Name of Painting	Year of creation	Current location
Annunciation	1466	Church of San Girolamo (Volterra)
Nativity	1470	Duomo (Volterra)
Annunciation	1470	Church of San Bernardino (Sinalunga)
Madonna triptych	1475	Church of San Michele Arcangelo (Montepertuso)
Madonna & 2 saints	1479	National Gallery (London)
Madonna of Mercy	1481	Monte dei Paschi (Siena)
Madonna & 4 Saints	1483	Church of San Domenico (Siena)
Ascension	1491	Church of San Eugenio (Siena)
Madonna & 2 Saints	1497	Church of Santa Flora e Lucilla (Torrita)
Ascension	1498	Metropolitan Museum of Art (New York)
Madonna & 2 Saints	1509	Church of Santa Lucia (Sinalunga)

Christ in Limbo 1491 National Gallery, Washington DC

== Legacy ==
As stated previously, Benvenuto's only known follower was his son, Girolamo. Nonetheless, it is believed that he did have influence upon other artists during his life. Specifically, works by the Sienese painter, Andrea di Niccolò, show significant evidence of Benvenuto's influence. In her dissertation, Diane Vatne details this connection, showing that Andrea and Benvenuto had a lifelong relationship, beginning with Benvenuto writing Andrea's tax returns in 1481 and continuing through Benvenuto's influence upon Andrea's work. However Andrea was not a follower or student of Benvenuto, the latter's influence was a mere result of proximity, both physically and emotionally.

Benvenuto's influence is the most evident in Andrea's 1502 version of the Crucifixion. In this painting, the sharpness and intensity of the drapery, figures, and colors point directly towards the influence of Benvenuto's later style. Other works are less obviously influenced by Benvenuto, but still hold characteristics that point towards his impact upon Andrea. These characteristics are largely ones pertaining towards Benvenuto's distinct naturalistic depiction of figures, crisp backgrounds, and intentional draping of clothing that are evident in Andrea's works.

== Gallery ==
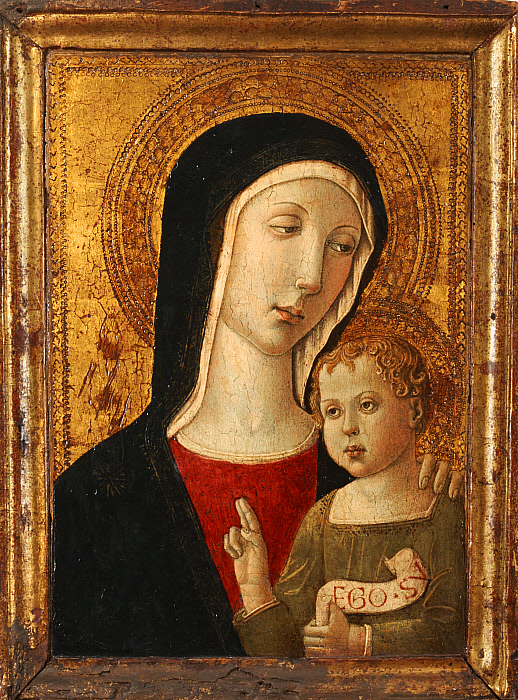
Virgin and Child (c.1465–70), Tempera and gold on panel, 16 1/16 x 11 3/4 in. (40.8 x 29.8 cm) Clark Art Institute
