= Annunciation with Saint Margaret and Saint Ansanus =

Painting by Simone Martini and Lippo Memmi

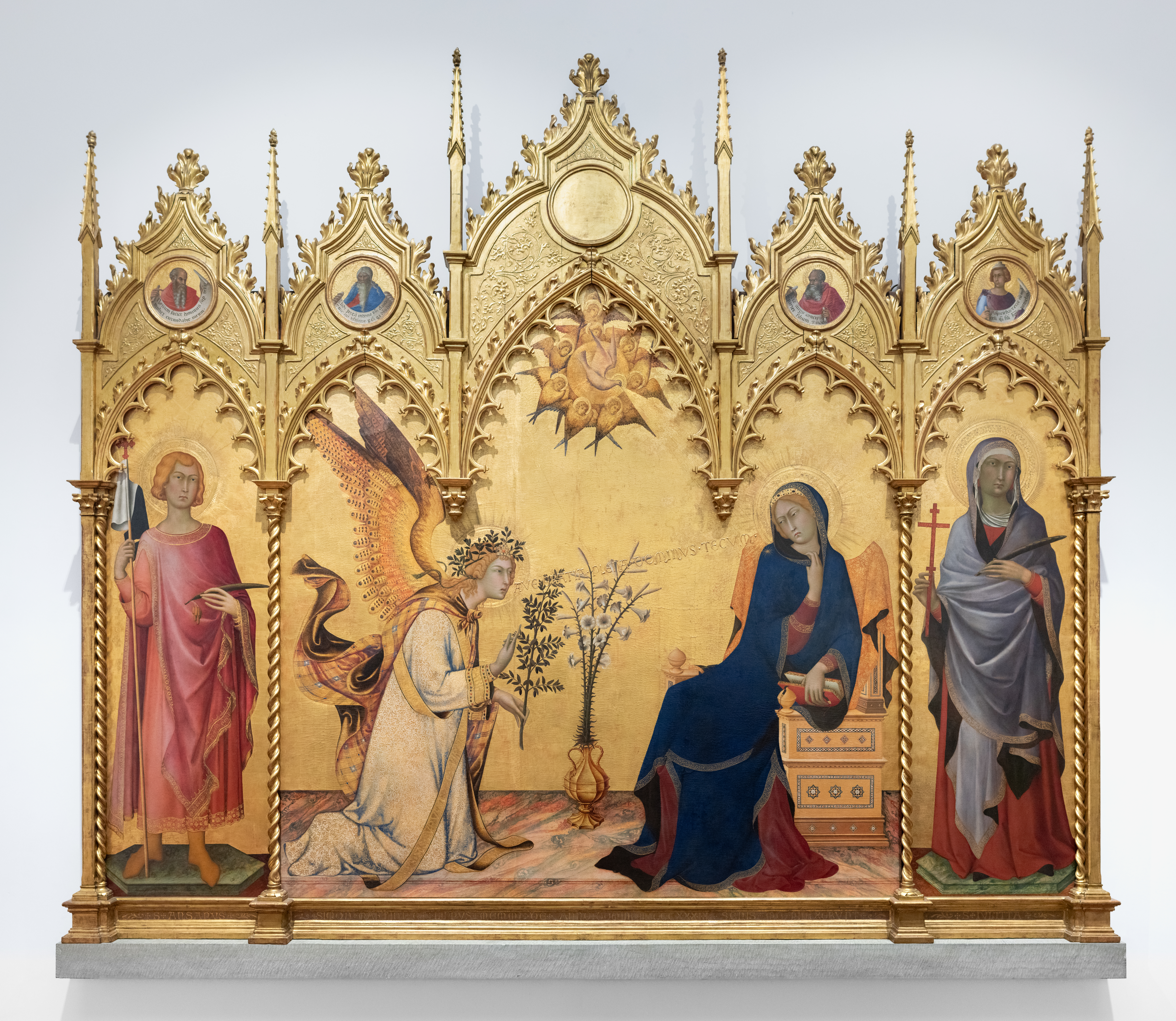
- Artist: Simone Martini and Lippo Memmi
- Year: 1333
- Type: Tempera and gold on panel
- Dimensions: 305 cm × 265 cm (120 in × 104 in)
- Location: Uffizi Gallery, Florence

The Annunciation with Saint Margaret and Saint Ansanus is a painting by the Italian Gothic artists Simone Martini and Lippo Memmi, now housed in the Uffizi Gallery in Florence, Italy. It is a wooden triptych painted in tempera and gold, with a central panel having double size. Considered Martini's masterwork and one of the most outstanding works of Gothic painting, the work was originally painted for a side altar in Siena Cathedral.

== History ==
The painting originally decorated the altar of Saint Ansanus in the Cathedral of Siena, and had been commissioned as part of a cycle of four altarpieces dedicated to the city's patron saints during 1330–1350. These included the Presentation at the Temple by Ambrogio Lorenzetti (1342; at the altar of Saint Crescentius), the Nativity of the Virgin by Pietro Lorenzetti (1342; at the altar of Saint Sabinus), and a Nativity, now disassembled, attributed to Bartolomeo Bulgarini (1351; at the altar of Saint Victor). All the paintings represent episodes in the Life of the Virgin, and were crowned by Duccio di Buoninsegna's Maestà. The artists' use of expensive lacquer, extensive gold leafing and the difficult to obtain lapis lazuli in the painting demonstrates the communal prestige of the commission.

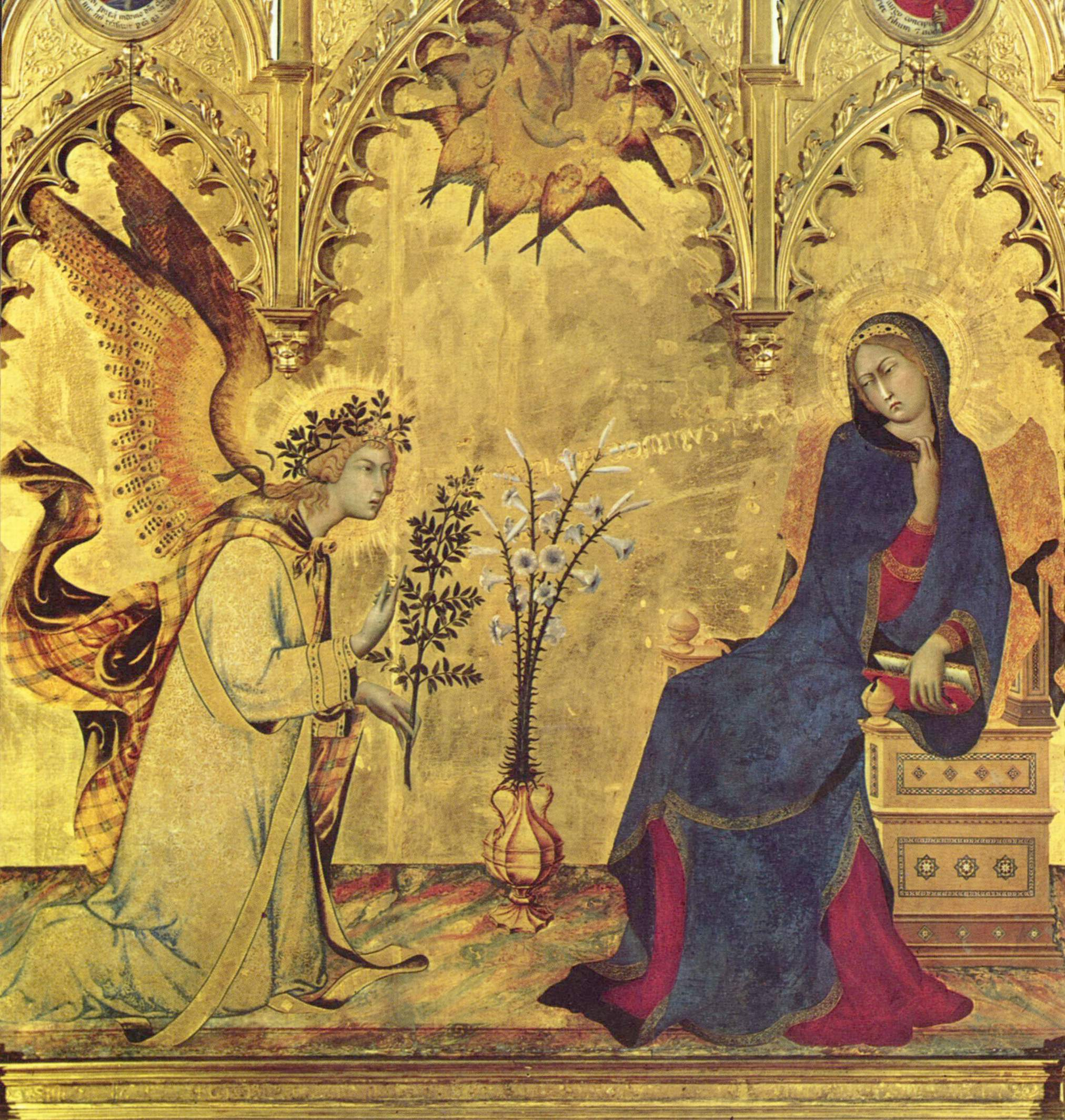
Detail of the central panel

The date of the painting is given in a fragment of the original frame, now embedded in the 19th-century renovation. It lists the names of Simone Martini and his brother-in-law Lippo Memmi (symon martini et lippvs memmi de senis me pinxervnt anno domini mcccxxxiii), although it is not known which parts were executed by which artist. A hypothesis is that Martini painted the central panel, while Memmi was responsible for the side saints and the tondi with prophets in the upper part.

The work, in both size and style, has no similarities with any other contemporary painting in Italy. It can be compared instead to French illuminated manuscripts of that time, as well as to paintings from Germany or England. His "northern European" style granted Martini a call from the papal court in Avignon, where there were Italian but no Florentine painters, as the Giottesque classical manner was met with little interest by the Gothic culture of the area.

The painting remained in the cathedral until 1799, when Grand Duke Peter Leopold had it moved to Florence in exchange of two canvasses by Luca Giordano. The original frame, carved by Paolo di Camporegio and gilt by Memmi, was renovated in 1420 and replaced by a modern frame in the 19th century.

== Description ==
The work is composed of a large central panel depicting the Annunciation, and two side panels with Saint Ansanus (left), and female saint, generarally identified as Saint Maxima or Saint Margaret, in the right, and four tondi in the cusps: Jeremiah, Ezekiel, Isaiah and Daniel.

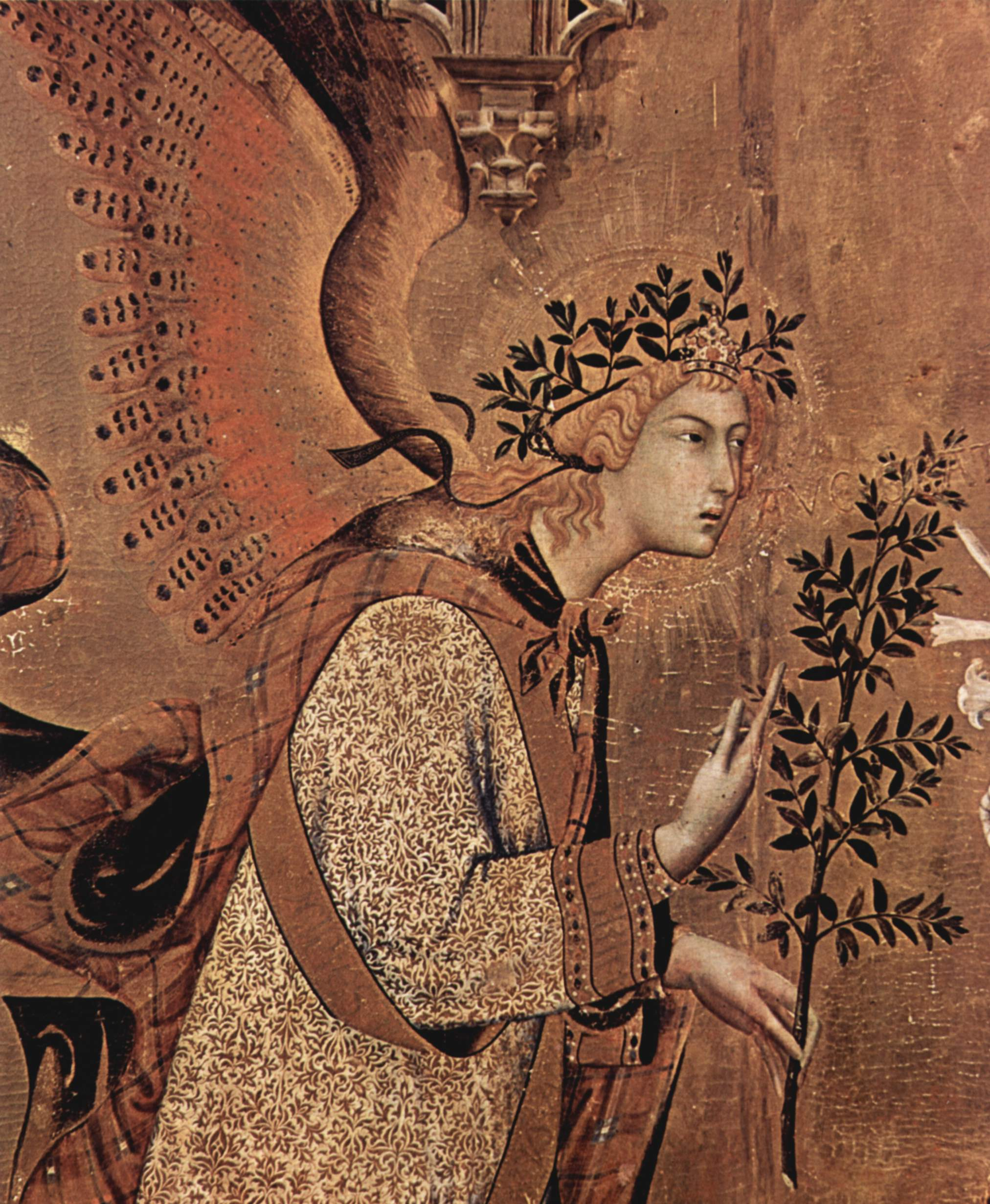
Detail of the Archangel Gabriel

The Annunciation shows the archangel Gabriel entering the house of the Virgin Mary to tell her that she will soon bear the child Jesus, whose name means 'savior'. Gabriel holds an olive branch in his hand, a traditional symbol of peace, while pointing at the Holy Ghost's dove with the other. The dove is descending from heaven, from the center of the mandorla of eight angels above, about to enter the Virgin's right ear. In fact, along the path of the dove, viewers see Gabriel's utterance: ave gratia plena dominvs tecvm ('Hail, full of grace, the Lord is with thee.'). The angel's mantle shows a detailed "tartar cloth" pattern and fine gilt feathers.

Mary, sitting on a throne, is portrayed at the moment that she is startled out of her reading, reacting with a graceful and composed reluctance, looking with surprise at the celestial messenger. Her dress has an arabesque-like pattern.

At the sides, the two saints are separated from the central scene by two decorate twisting columns. The background, completely gilt, has a vase of lilies, an allegory of purity often associated with the Virgin Mary.

External videos
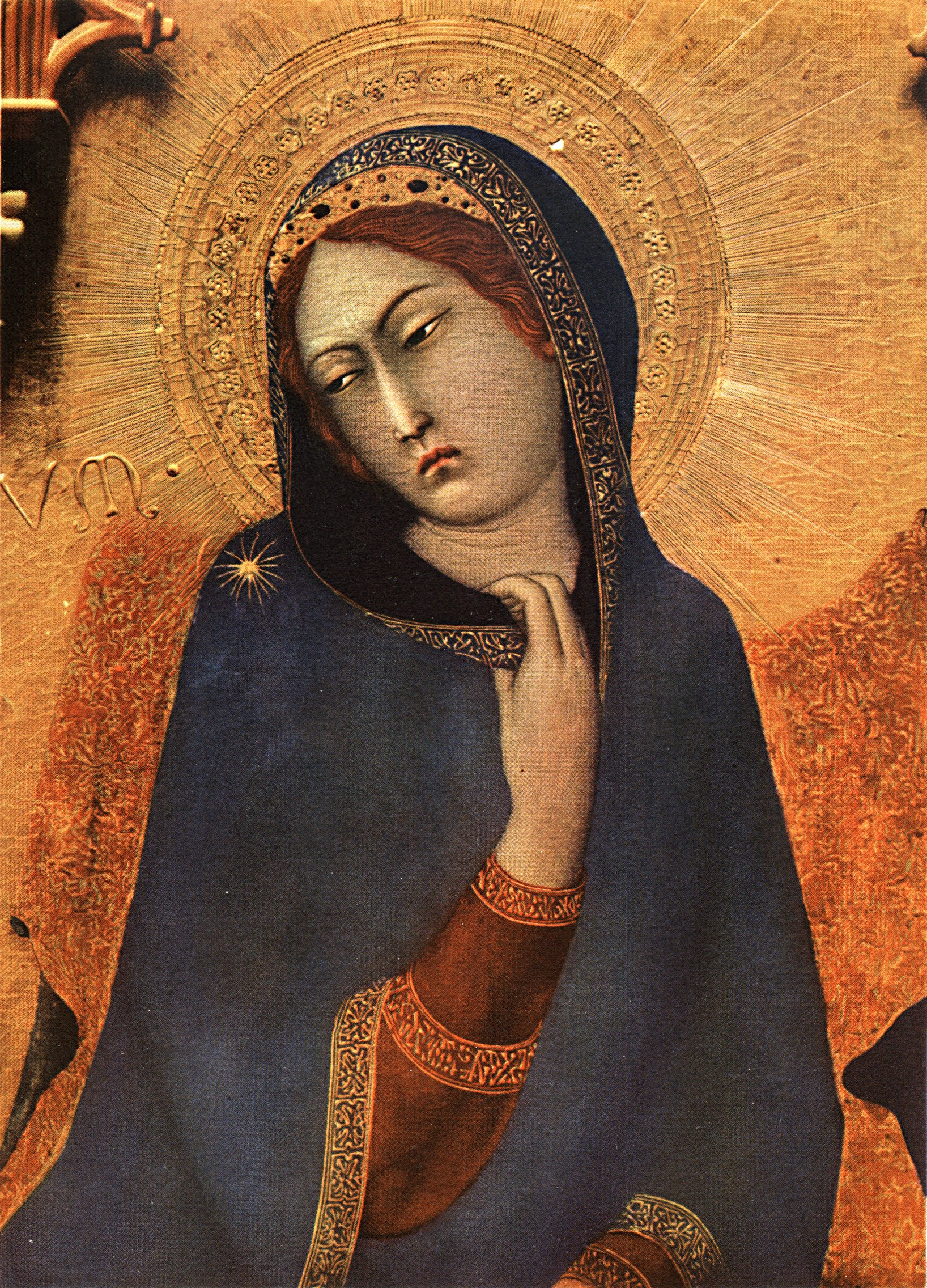
- Detail of the Madonna from the Annunciation
- Lecture about Simone Martini's Annunciation at Smarthistory

The use of a Gothic line, plus such realistic elements as the book, the vase, the throne, the pavement in perspective, the realistic action of the two figures and their subtle nuances of character are a substantial detachment from the two-dimensionality typical of Byzantine art.
