= Presentation at the Temple (Ambrogio Lorenzetti) =

1342 painting by Ambrogio Lorenzetti

- Artist: Ambrogio Lorenzetti
- Year: 1342
- Medium: Tempera on panel
- Dimensions: 257 cm × 168 cm (101 in × 66 in)
- Location: Uffizi Gallery, Florence

The Presentation at the Temple is a 1342 painting by the Italian late medieval painter Ambrogio Lorenzetti, signed and dated 1342, now housed in the Uffizi Gallery of Florence, Italy. It is one of the largest works by the Italian medieval painter, as well as one of the five which he signed and dated.

== History ==
The painting originally decorated the altar of St. Crescentius in the Cathedral of Siena, and had been commissioned as part of a cycle of four altarpieces dedicated to the city's patrons saints (St. Ansanus, St. Sabinus of Spoleto, St. Crescentius and St. Victor) during 1330–1350. These included the Annunciation with St. Margaret and St. Ansanus by Simone Martini and Lippo Memmi, the Nativity of the Virgin by Pietro Lorenzetti (1342, Altar of St. Sabinus), and a Nativity, now disassembled, attributed to Bartolomeo Bulgarini from 1351 (altar of St. Victor). All the paintings should represent stories of the Life of the Madonna, and were crowned by Duccio di Buoninsegna's Maestà. The use of expensive lacquer in the paintings and lapis lazuli shows the prestige of the commission.

Two 15th-century descriptions mention the work as a triptych, with two side panels portraying St. Michael Archangel and St. Crescentius Martyr (who held his head in a hand) and, below, a predella. A century later, artists including Giovanni di Paolo and Bartolo di Fredi executed copies of the painting. It was later disassembled and placed in a nunnery in Siena. Grand Duke Ferdinand III of Tuscany had his transferred to Florence in 1822. It became part of the Uffizi collection in 1913.

== Description ==
The painting depicts the presentation at the temple, an event which, according to the Hebraic Law, should occur forty days after a child's birth, to allow the mother to purify herself. Within two central, slender columns are the Madonna (holding the cloth in which the child was kept), the child (with moving feet and a finger in the mouth), and Simeon the Righteous, who is speaking and taking the child in his arms. At the far left is Joseph, preceded by two women: the latter have no aureolae, to mark that they have no holy status. At the right is Anna, accompanied by a Latin cartouche with a citation from the Gospel of Luke (2:38 – And coming up at that very hour she gave thanks to God, and spoke of him to all who were looking for the redemption of Jerusalem.) Behind the altar is a priest with the pigeons for the sacrifice on the altar fire and, in the left hand, the knife. The sacrificial pigeons appear on the edge of the painting rather than the center to focus on the purification offering. Two other priests are partly visible at his left behind the architectural elements.

The scene is set within church, finely decorated in Gothic style (somewhat similar to the Cathedral of Siena) with a nave and two aisles, each surmounted by three-foiled ogival arches. Above the priests, within the church, is a triumphal arch with two angels; they hold a clipeus with the Blessing Christ. The lunettes of the aisles show prophets with cartouches, while above the columns in the foreground are depicted two small statues of Moses, with the table of the Ten Commandments, and Joshua, with the Sun in his hand. In the upper part, above the marble intarsia of the arches and frieze with dragons, is a series of angels with a garland.

Finally, the central top arch includes the figures of Moses and Malachi, who also have cartouches with Latin verses taken from the Bible.

== Sources ==
- Frugoni, Chiara (2010). Pietro e Ambrogio Lorenzetti. Florence: Le Lettere. ISBN 978-88-71-66668-6.
