= Nativity of the Virgin (Pietro Lorenzetti) =

Painting by Pietro Lorenzetti

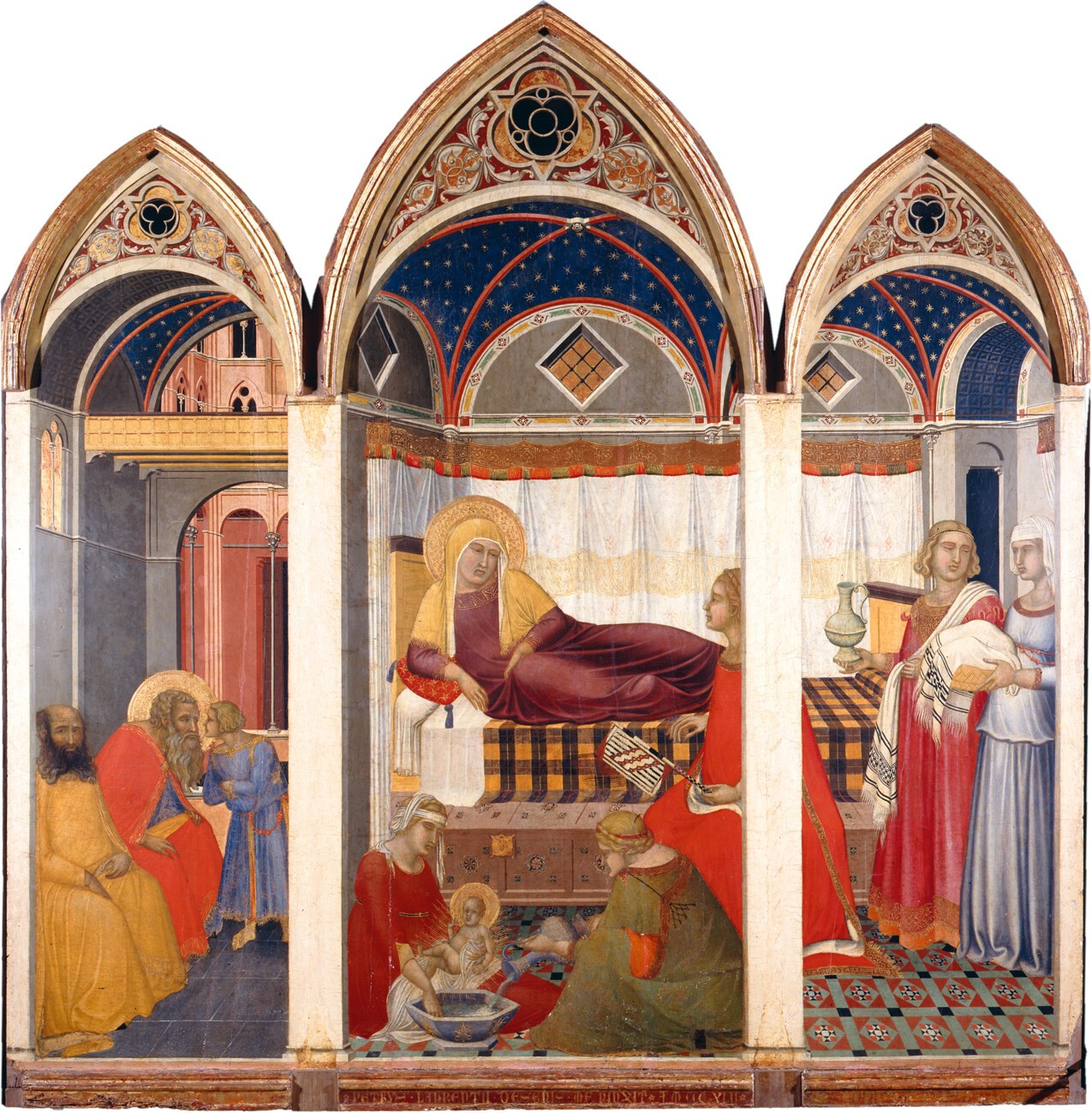
- Artist: Pietro Lorenzetti
- Year: 1335-1342
- Medium: Tempera on panel
- Dimensions: 182 cm × 187 cm (72 in × 74 in)
- Location: Museo dell'Opera del Duomo, Siena

The Nativity of the Virgin is a painting by the Italian late medieval painter Pietro Lorenzetti, dating from around 1335–1342, now housed in the Museo dell'Opera del Duomo of Siena, Italy.

== History ==
The painting originally decorated the altar of St. Sabinus in the Cathedral of Siena, and had been commissioned as part of a cycle of four altarpieces dedicated to the city's patrons saints (St. Ansanus, St. Sabinus of Spoleto, St. Crescentius and St. Victor) during 1330–1350. These included the Annunciation with St. Margaret and St. Ansanus by Simone Martini and Lippo Memmi, the Presentation at the Temple by Ambrogio Lorenzetti (1342, altar of St. Crescentius), and a Nativity, now disassembled, attributed to Bartolomeo Bulgarini from 1351 (altar of St. Victor). All the paintings should represent stories of the Life of the Madonna, and were crowned by Duccio di Buoninsegna's Maestà.

== Description ==
The work is a triptych, although the scenes are set in the same location (an unusual feature for the time), a room whose vaults follow the shape of the panel; the scenes, painted using a crude geometrical perspective, are separated by two white piers in the foreground. The vaults have a starry night sky, as typical of Gothic edifices of the time.

The left scene depicts Joachim, Mary's father, waiting together with a child and an old man. Behind him, an opened lunette and arcade show the court of a Gothic palace. St. Anna is lying on a bed (a typical medieval chest) in the central scene with a white drape behind, while, in the foreground, two women are washing her daughter. A woman, wearing a red dress, is shown behind the right pier, while speaking with Anna; she holds an inlaid object, perhaps a banner or a musical instrument. Two further women with washing accessories appear in the right panel.

== Sources ==
- De Vecchi, Pierluigi; Elda Cerchiari (1999). I tempi dell'arte. Milan: Bompani.
