= Museo dell'Opera del Duomo (Siena) =

Museum of Siena cathedral, Italy

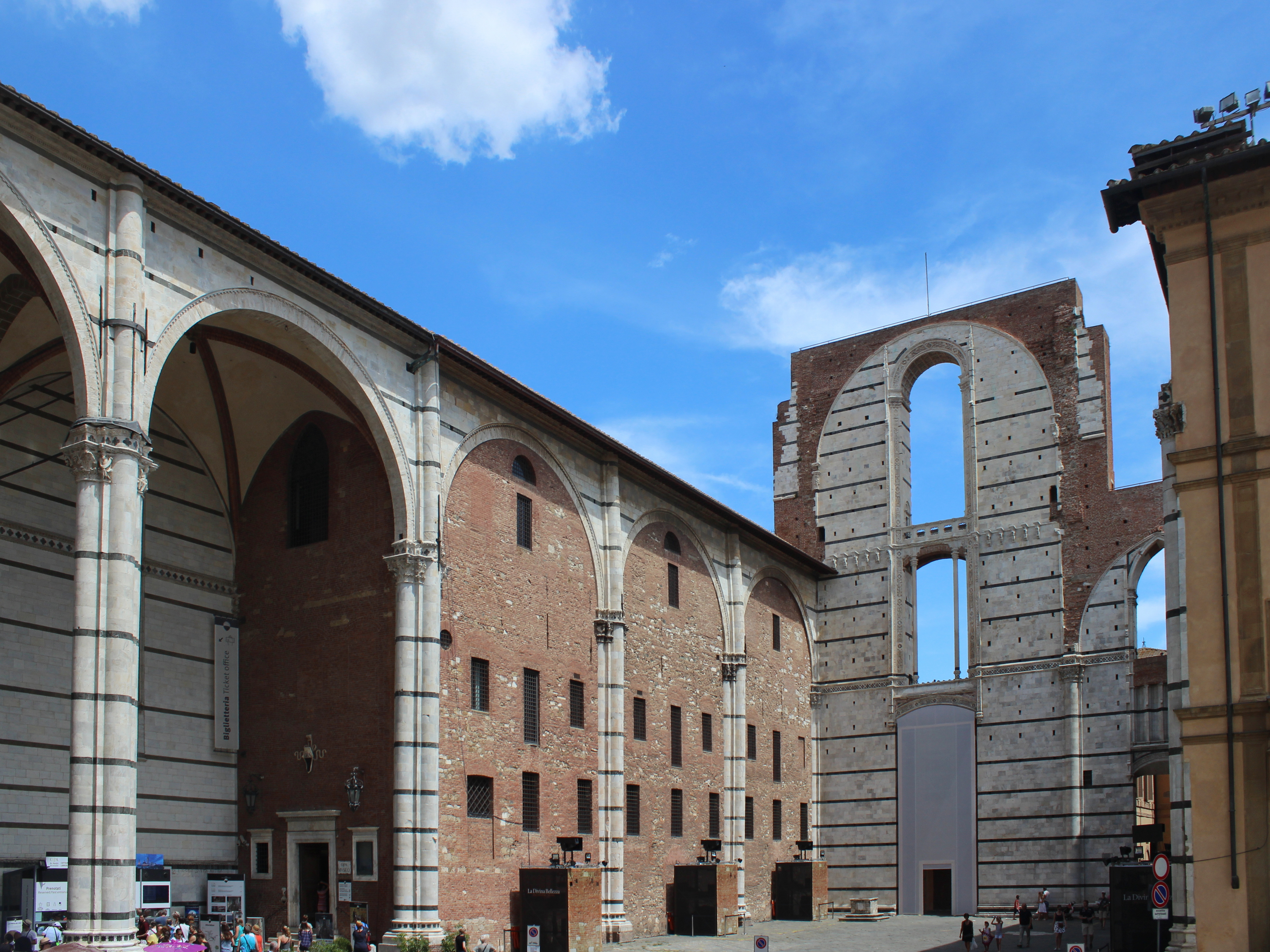
- The museum in the right aisle of the unfinished Duomo Nuovo
- Established: 1879
- Coordinates: 43.3177°N 11.3296°E
- Website: operaduomo.siena.it

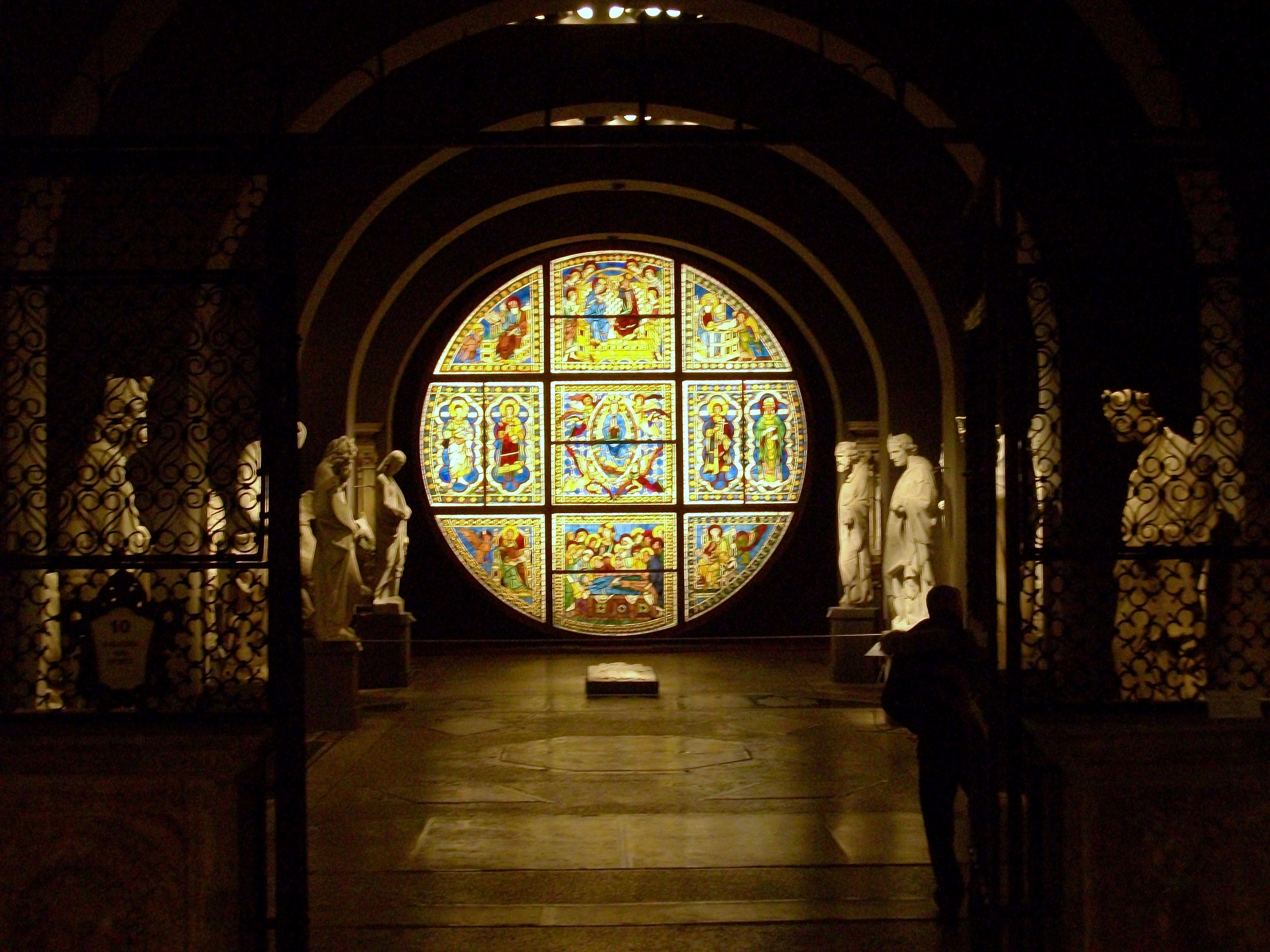
Interior of the museum with the original rose window designed by Duccio

The Museo dell'Opera del Duomo is an art museum in Siena, in Tuscany in central Italy. It houses works of art and architectural fragments that were formerly in, or a part of, the Duomo of Siena (Siena Cathedral). These include a number of Italian Gothic sculptures by Giovanni Pisano and his school from the façade of the cathedral; the Maestà of Duccio di Boninsegna, which was the cathedral's altarpiece in the crossing beneath the dome from about 1311 until 1505 or 1506;, works by Ambrogio and Pietro Lorenzetti (14th ct.), as well as Donatello's Madonna del Perdono (1457) There are also works moved to the museum from other churches in the area, such as the Madonna of Duccio brought from the Pieve di Santa Cecilia at Crevole in the comune of Murlo.
