= Portrait of a Young Man holding a Roundel =

Painting by Sandro Botticelli

Portrait of a Young Man Holding a Roundel
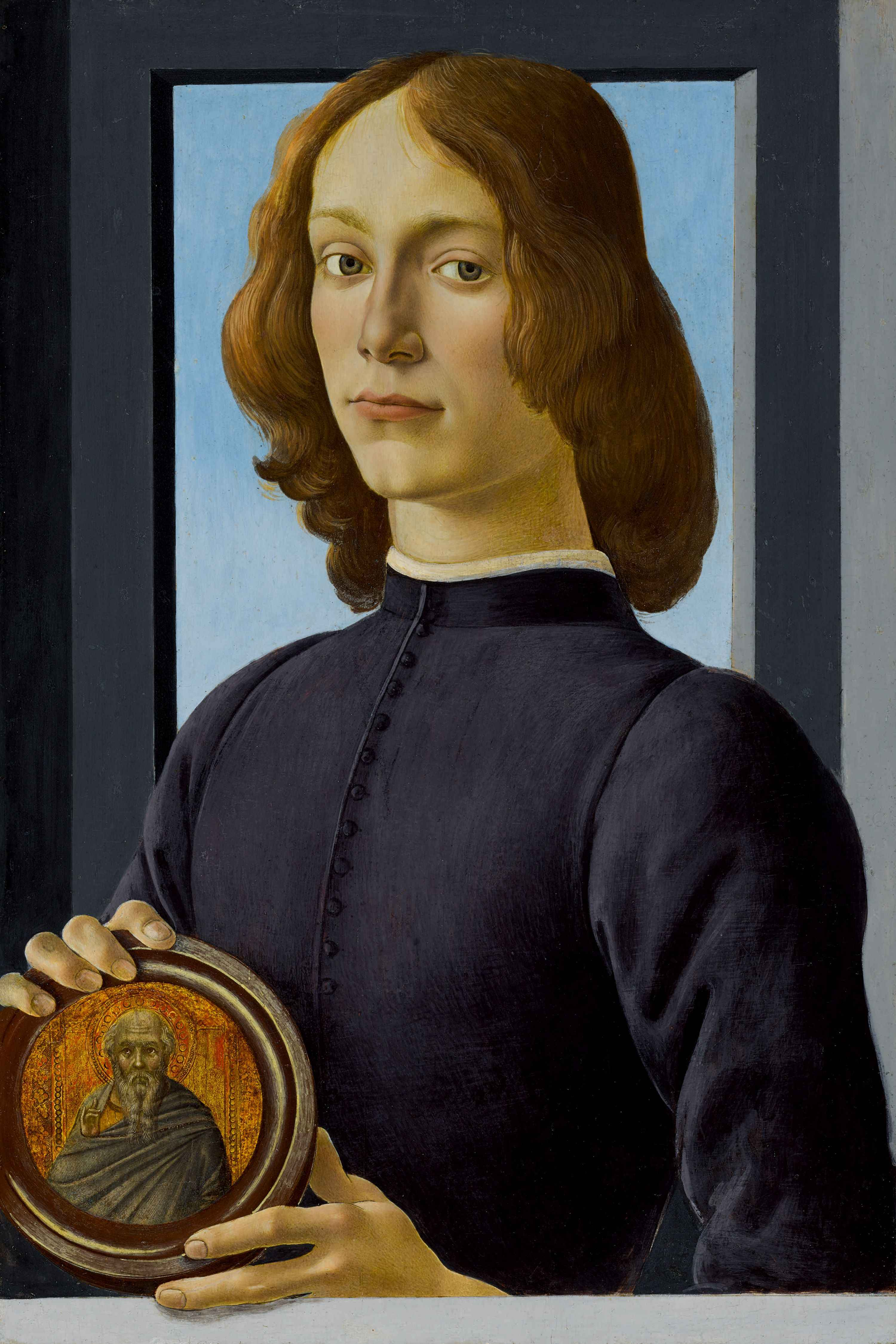
- Artist: Sandro Botticelli
- Year: c. 1480
- Medium: Tempera on poplar wood
- Movement: Italian Renaissance
- Dimensions: 58.7 cm × 38.9 cm (23.1 in × 15.3 in)
- Owner: Private collection

The Portrait of a Young Man Holding a Roundel (also known as Portrait of a Young Man holding a Trecento Medallion) is a painting attributed to the Italian Renaissance master Sandro Botticelli. On the basis of its style it has been estimated to have been painted around 1480. The identity of the portrait's subject is unknown, but analysts suggest it could be someone from the Medici family, as Lorenzo de' Medici was one of Botticelli's main benefactors.

== Description of the painting ==
The painting, thought to have been completed c. 1480, is believed to represent the beauty ideals of Renaissance Florentine high society. The young man's tunic is of a simple, fine quality with a blue color very rare at the time. The work was painted in tempera on poplar wood with a width of 38.9 cm and a height of 58.7 cm. The figure of the bearded saint in the trecento medallion was added after the portrait was completed and is believed to be an original by Bartolomeo Bulgarini, also known as the "Ovile Master". The medallion is very similar to other works by Bulgarini with a presumption that it was originally trimmed from a rectangular trecento. The young man is portrayed in front of a window frame in which the artist has fashioned a series of color planes. The inner frame is a uniform grey color, and appears to have a bright blueish tone to the left with a darker grey one in the right so the colors seem to change from left to right. One of the young man's fingers, supporting the medallion from below, rests on a bright grey strip at the bottom of the painting. The hand acts as a repoussoir that provides the illusion that the medallion is in another level within the painting.

== History and ownership ==
The first modern record of the painting was in 1938, when it was owned by Baron Newborough. At the time, the art dealer Frank Sabin visited the Newborough estate and appraised the painting's value. Lord Newborough was ignorant of the true value of the painting, so Sabin managed to buy the piece for a relatively low price. Art historians assumed that the painting came into the possession of the Newborough family when the 1st Baron Newborough, Thomas Winn, lived in Florence, Italy between 1782 and 1791.

Sabin sold the portrait to the collector Sir Thomas Merton in 1941 for a five-figure sum. During Merton's ownership the portrait was first described as a work by Botticelli. The attribution to Botticelli was doubted later, as prominent monographs on Botticelli did not include the portrait as one of his. Currently a majority of the art historians accept the attribution to Botticelli. While the Merton family owned the portrait, it became the subject of a poster for a Royal Academy of Arts Exhibition of Italian Art in 1960. In 1982, Merton's descendants sold the painting for £ 810,000 at an auction at Christie's.

After Sheldon Solow bought the piece in 1982, the portrait was loaned to major museums including the Metropolitan Museum of Art in New York, the National Gallery in London, and the Städel Museum in Frankfurt, where it was displayed in a Botticelli exhibition in 2009–2010. In January 2021, the portrait was sold at an auction at Sotheby's New York for more than US$92.2 million to a Russian-speaking collector. The price for the painting was the highest paid for a Botticelli and the highest for an Old Master work since Leonardo Da Vinci's Salvator Mundi sold in 2017.

== See also ==
- List of works by Sandro Botticelli
