= San Sabino, Spoleto =

Church in Spoleto, Italy

Coordinates: 42.764710°N 12.731683°E

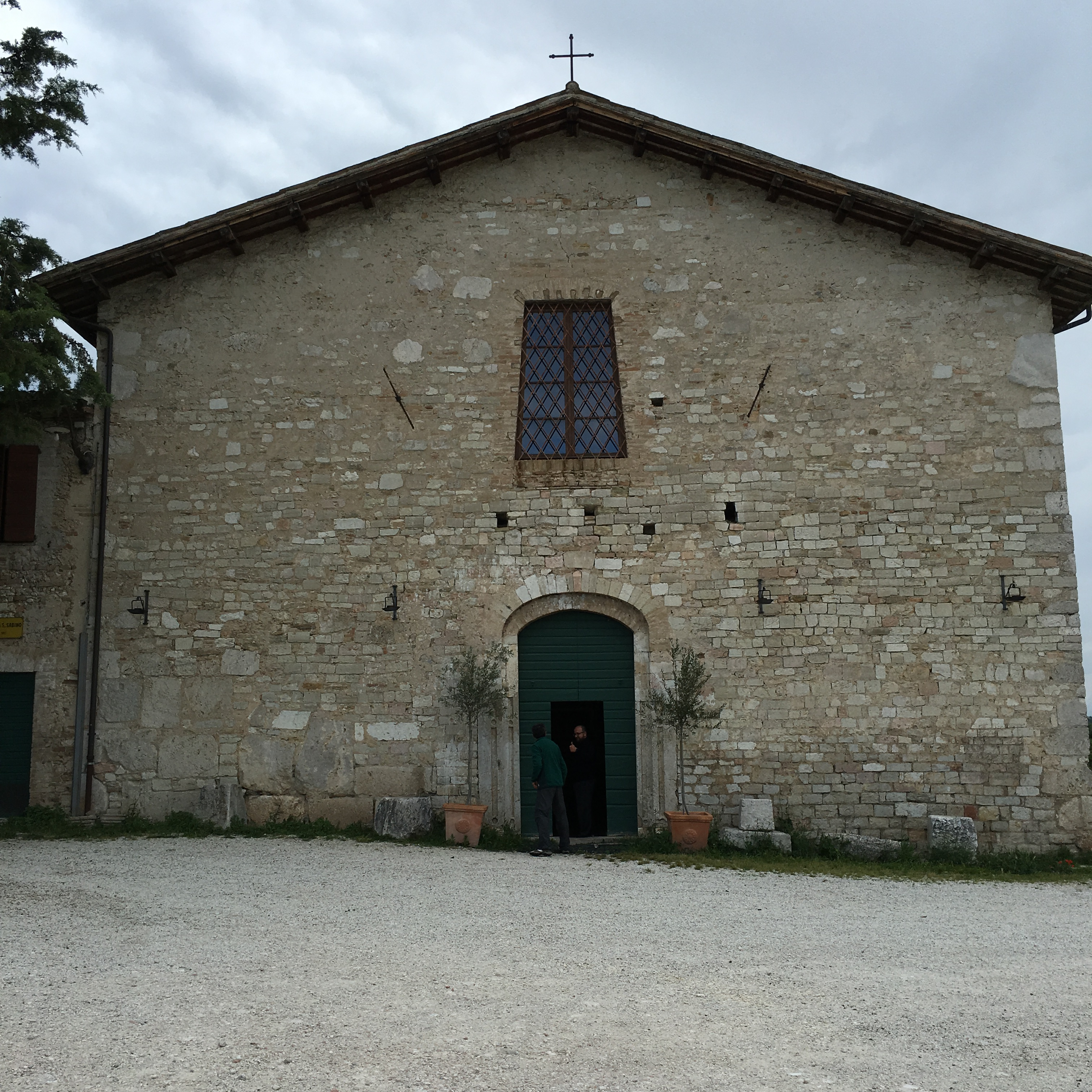
Facade of San Sabino, note different composition of upper facade rebuilt after the 1767 earthquake.

San Sabino is a Romanesque-style, Roman Catholic rural parish church located on vicolo San Sabino #22, east of SS685 and north of the historic center of Spoleto, region of Umbria, Italy.

== History and description ==
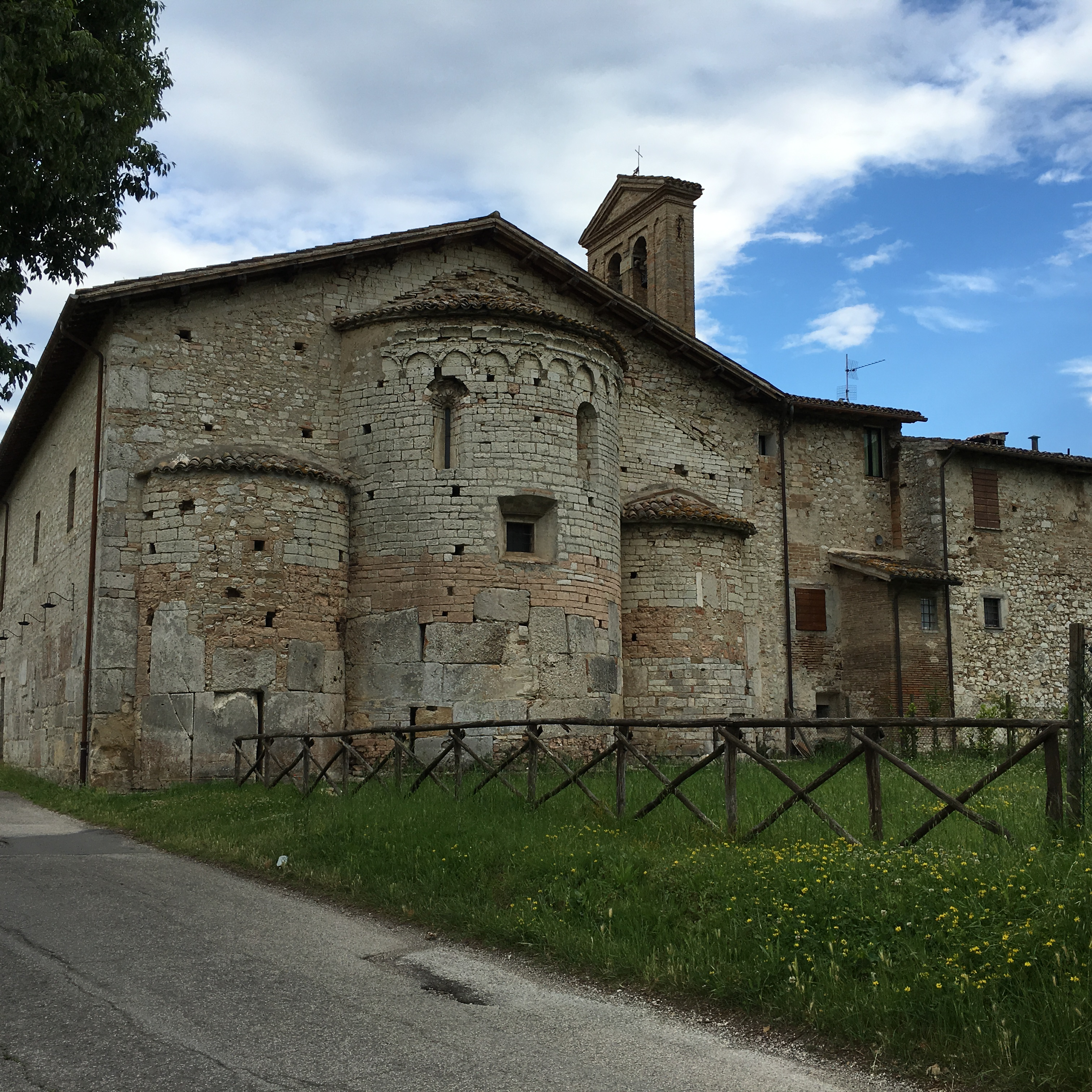
Romanesque apses

A church at this site appears to have been present from perhaps the 6th-century. The structure appears to employ spolia from prior Ancient Roman buildings, and according to 19th-century excavations, it may have been a site for an early Christian cemetery. Documentary evidence from a Lombard chronicle from 787 A.D. mentions a site housing the relics of the bishop of Spoleto, Sabinus, martyred by Emperor Maximilian. One chronicler mentions that the Lombard duke Ariulf of Spoleto (died 602) prayed before the relics of the Saint prior to a battle.

However the layout of this church was established in the 11th-12th centuries with an eastern facade. Over the centuries, the church was modified, most dramatically after the earthquake in 1767, when the facade, roof, and apse required rebuilding. From the outside, the presbytery end maintains the typical Romanesque semicircular apses. The interior side altars and roof date from the 17th and 18th centuries respectively. It is unclear if some or all of the relics of the Saint still reside here.
