= Bartolomeo Bulgarini =

Italian 14th-century painter

- Born: c. 1300-1310
- Died: 1378 (aged 67–78)
- Occupation: Painter

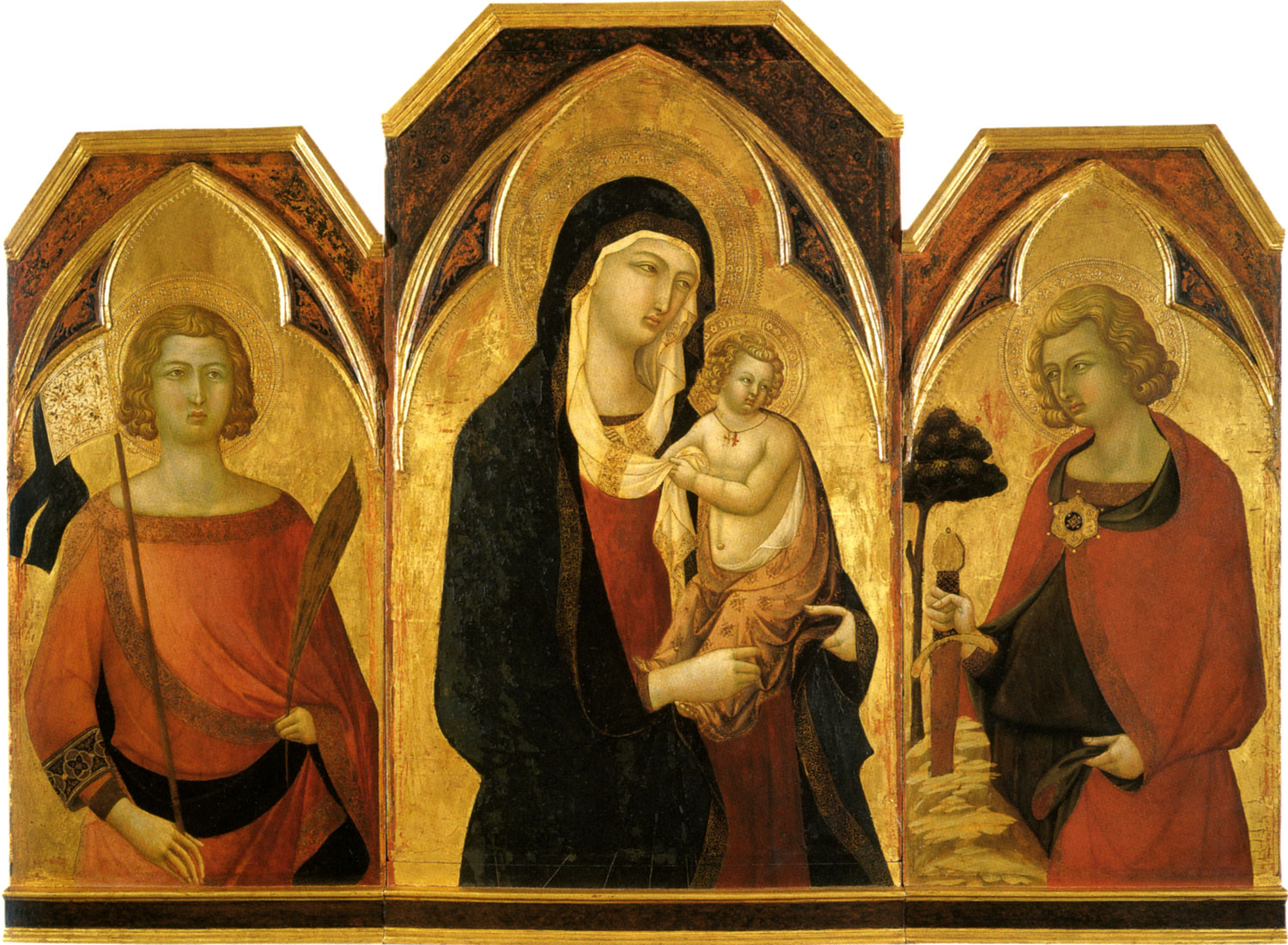
Madonna and child and Saints (c. 1335) Pinacoteca Nazionale, Siena

Bartolomeo Bulgarini (c. 1300/1310–1378), also known as Bulgarino or Bologhini, was an Italian painter of the Trecento in Siena, active both before and after the Black Death of 1348.

Bulgarini's name came into popular prominence in January 2021, when Portrait of a Young Man holding a Roundel by Botticelli was sold at Sotheby's for a record 80 million dollars (over 92 million after fees and commission). The roundel has an inset original painting of a bearded man (probably a saint), attributed to Bulgarini.

== Rediscovery ==
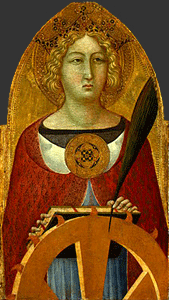
Ugilino Lorenzetti Ste Cathérine

Although Bartolomeo Bulgarini is a documented and famous name ever since the Trecento, only in the last few decades art historians have succeeded in reconnecting it to a catalogue of works. In 1917, Bernard Berenson recognized stylistic similarities in a group of nine works by anonymous painters, referencing both Ugolino di Nerio and Pietro Lorenzetti. The paintings were grouped under a composite name invented by Berenson: Ugolino Lorenzetti. Few years later, however, Ernst Dewald separated six of the paintings of this group, claimed that they were by another painter who was simply Lorenzettian, and added some more paintings to support his claim. One of these paintings was a painting of the Virgin and Child Enthroned with a provenance from the church of San Pietro a Ovile, which is why Dewald named this anonymous painter the Master of the Ovile Madonna. In the 1930s, Millard Meiss proposed that the two catalogues belong together, and that it demonstrates the work of a painter whose earliest style was closest to Ugolino, which then developed into a style closer to Pietro, to eventually evolve into a style with a particular interest for Simone Martini, adding some more works to prove his point. Meiss kept to the name Ugolino Lorenzetti. Most important for the following identification of this catalogue, or oeuvre, with the name Bartolomeo Bulgarini is the currently dismembered and dispersed St. Victor altarpiece for Siena Cathedral: the Nativity at the Fogg Museum and the Crucifixion at the Louvre, recognized by Henk van Os as the central panel and a predella panel of the then still missing Cathedral altarpiece, have always been at the core of the catalogues described above, and in the 1980s documentary evidence was found in the Cathedral archives for Bartolomeo to have painted this altarpiece around 1350. Only panel paintings have been attributed to Bartolomeo.

== Life ==
Bartolomeo was born into a noble family, members of which had held prominent offices in the city and had served in the Council of Nine, Siena’s governing body between 1287 and 1355. His earliest works date around the late 1330s and early 1340s, after his training in the workshop of Duccio's students Ugolino di Nerio or Pietro Lorenzetti, or both. They included smaller civic commissions, such as painting the wooden covers of the Biccherna, which included the administration of the civic treasury, and of which few have survived. His altarpiece with Saints Ansanus and Galganus flanking the Virgin and Child, currently at the Pinacoteca of Siena, is one of his earliest paintings and may have been made for the Palazzo della Signoria of Siena. He also started painting altarpieces for religious communities in and near Lucca, Florence, San Gimignano, and other cities in present-day Tuscany. It is possible that his family connections afforded him special opportunities for Sienese patronage. When the generation of his teachers died, such as Simone Martini in 1344, and Pietro and Ambrogio Lorenzetti in 1348, probably because of the Black Death, he rose to prominence and was soon recognized as one of the best Sienese painters. He finished unfinished works by Simone and the Lorenzetti for the Comune of his hometown, and perhaps even worked in Rome, for the Papal Curia. In the 1360s and 1370s, until his death, he painted surviving works for the prestigious hospital of Santa Maria della Scala in Siena, where he became an oblate in 1366. He represents the Sienese school of painting, working in an Italo-Byzantine style on a gold ground, and is the only Sienese painter of his generation commemorated by Giorgio Vasari in the sixteenth century.

== The St. Victor Altarpiece ==
This altarpiece (1348–1350), found in the Siena Cathedral, was one of four altarpieces commissioned by the Commune, that depict the four patrons saints of the city. The other three altarpieces: St Ansanus by Simone Martini, St Crescentious by Ambrogio Lorenzetti and St Savinus by Pietro Lorenzetti; were identified earlier because the panels were signed and dated, and because of 15th century inventories from the cathedral. However, none of these sources were consistent in mentioning the St Victor Altarpiece. It wasn't until the late 16th century that previously lost inventories, made by Guigurta Tommasi, named Bulgarini as the painter of the St Victor altarpiece.

== The Assumption of the Virgin and Doubting Thomas Altarpiece ==
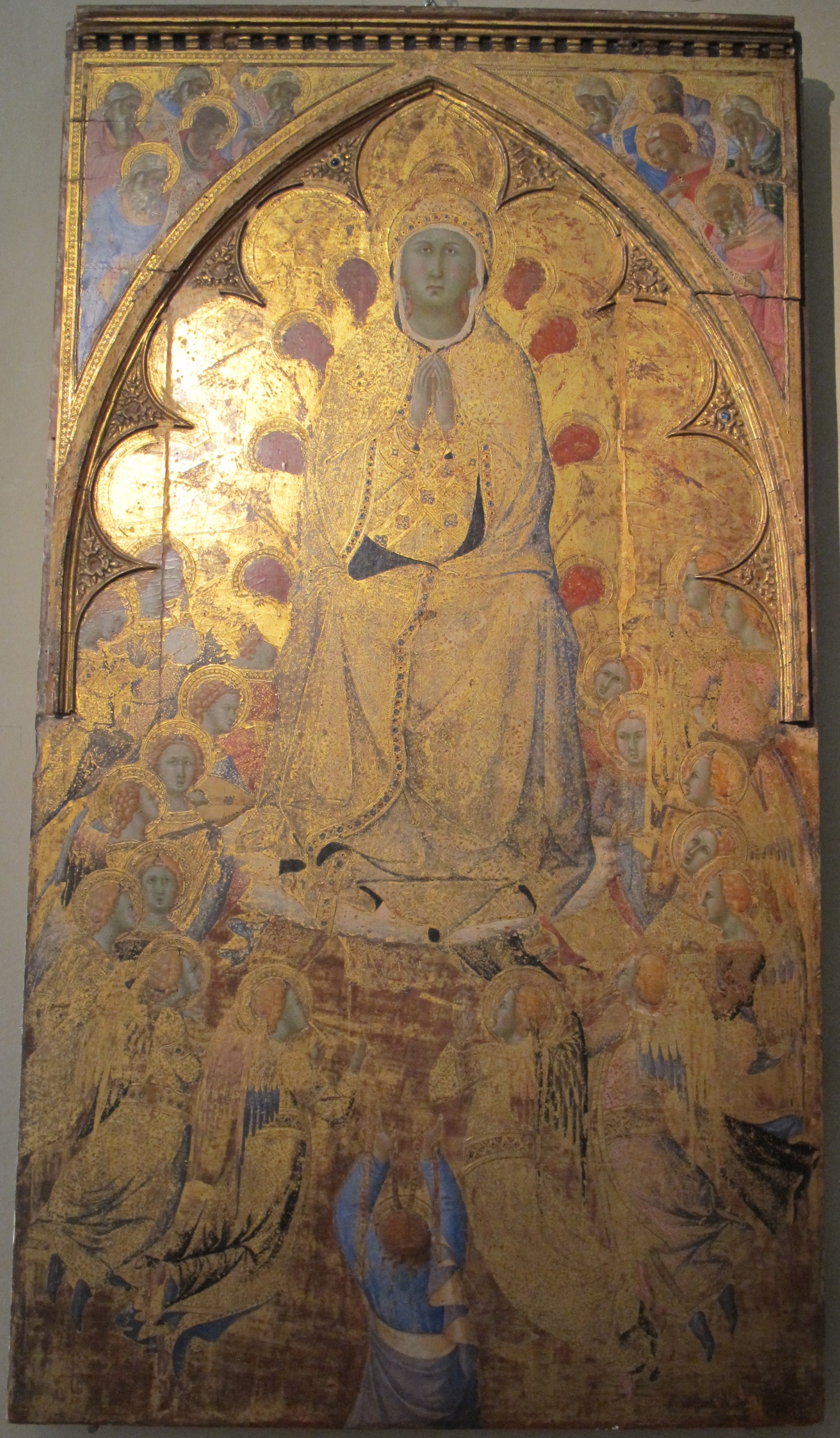
Assumption of Virgin altarpiece in Santa Maria della Scala church

The Assumption of the Virgin with Doubting Thomas (early 1360s) is a large panel painted by Bulgarini. It was part of an altarpiece for the chapel which housed a group of important relics acquired by the Santa Maria della Scala Hospital from Constantinople, which included the Virgin’s belt or girdle that she cast down to Thomas as tangible proof of her physical ascent to heaven.

The importance of the relics is reflected in the composition of the panel painted by Bulgarini. Bulgarini’s somewhat unusual portrayal of Thomas with his back to the viewer differs from other iconography of the period, perhaps representing the position of the parishioners and Sienese officiants in worship of the virgin and the recently acquired relics in the newly constructed chapel.

== Works ==
Works attributed to Bulgarini are found at the Isabella Stewart Gardner Art Museum in Boston; the Fogg Art Museum in Cambridge; the Städel Art Museum in Frankfurt (Blinding of St Victor); and the Wallraf Richartz Art Museum in Cologne (Enthroned Madonna and Child).

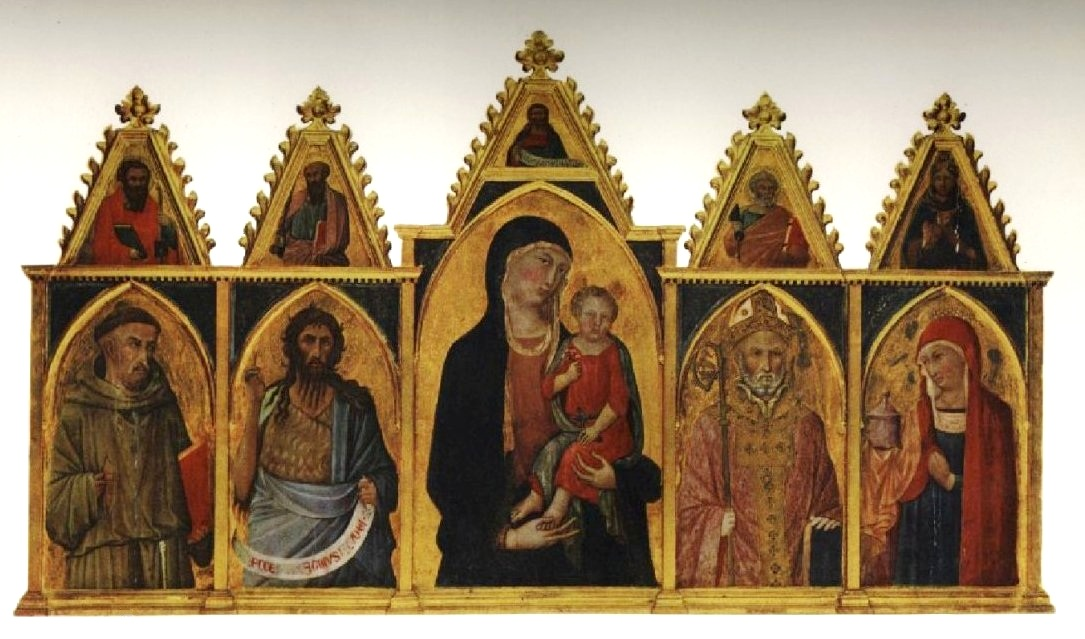
Berenson Polyptych (1340s) Villa I Tatti, Florence.

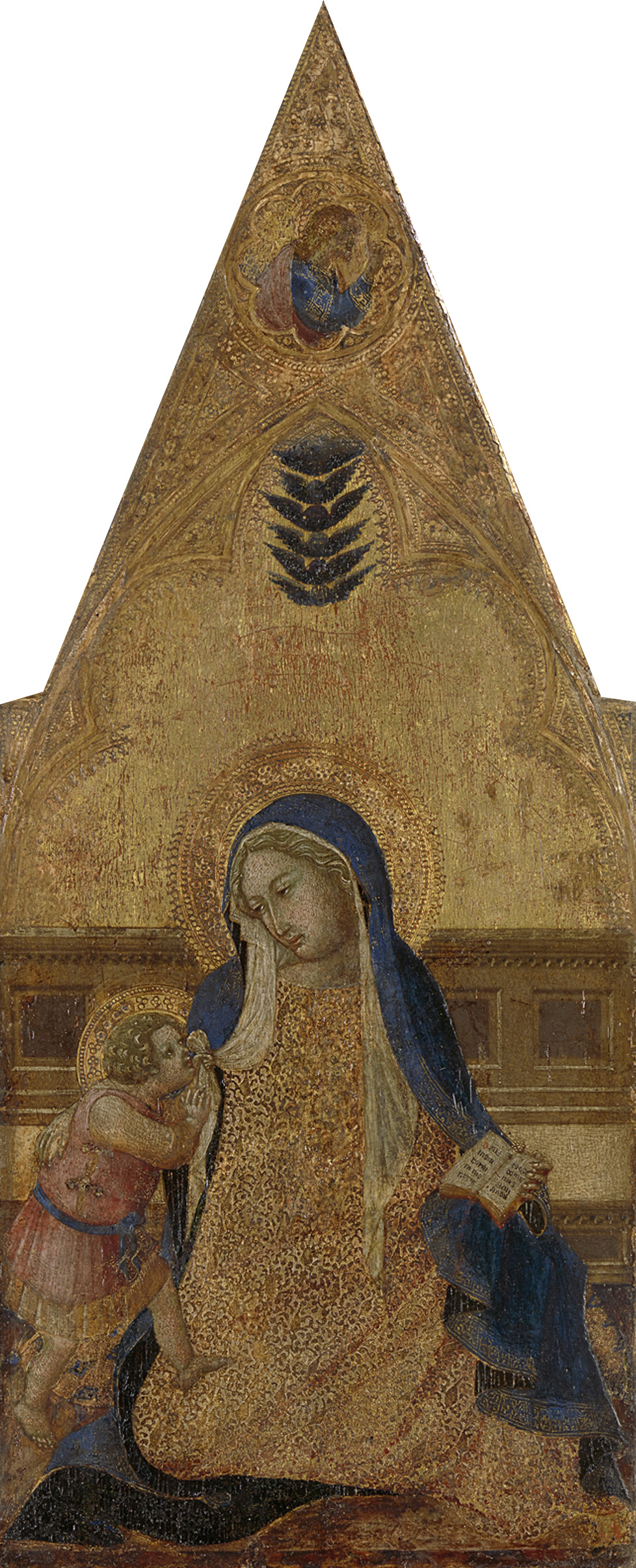
Madonna van de nederigheid

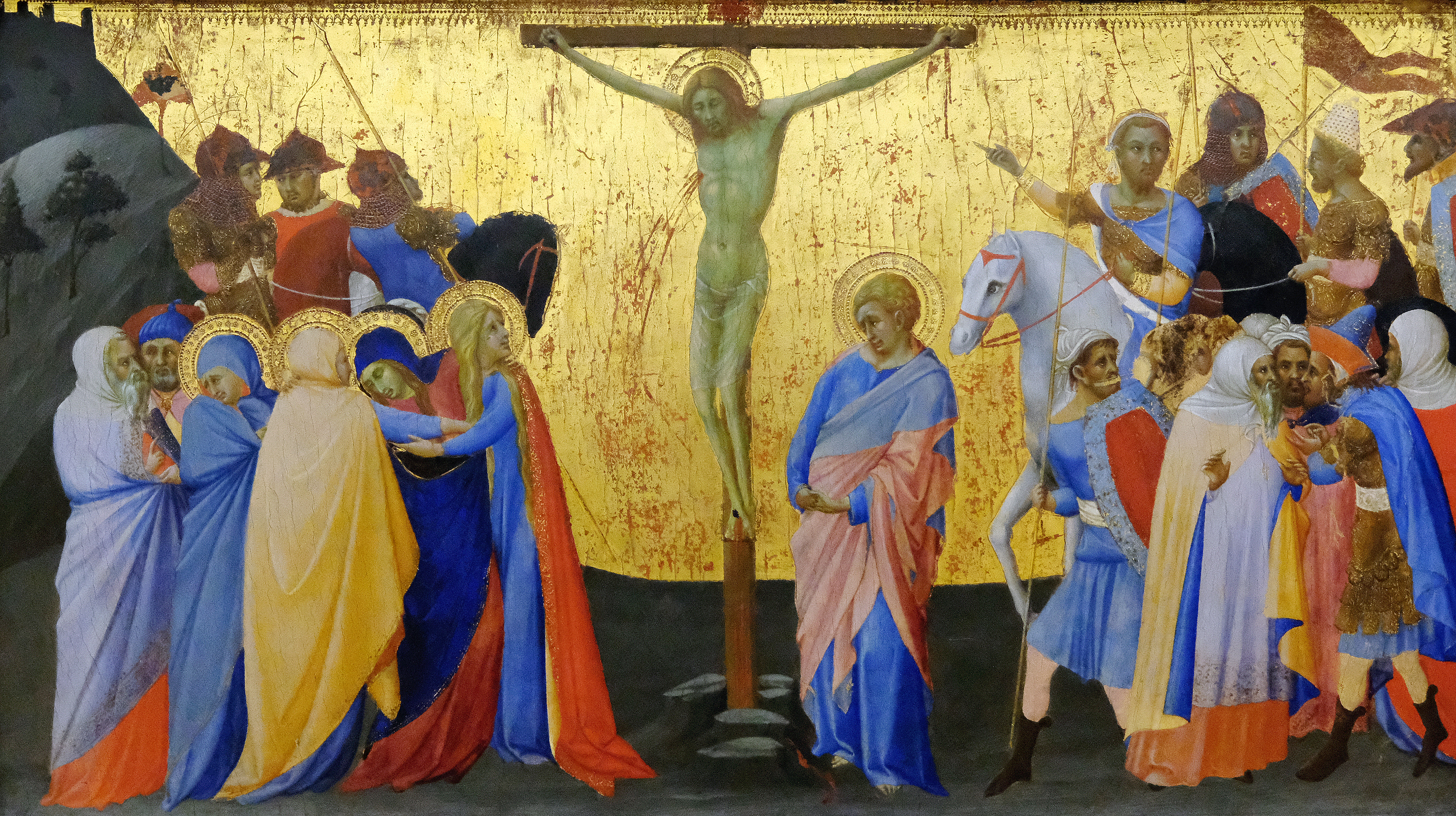
La Crucifixion Louvre museum
