= Maxima of Rome =

Christian saint (d. ca. 304)

Martyr
- Born: unknown
- Died: c. 304; Rome, Italy
- Canonized: pre-Congregation
- Feast: 2 September

Maxima of Rome (/ˈmæksɪmə/) was a slave and friend of Saint Ansanus of Siena. She was martyred by being beaten to death in the persecutions of Diocletian, circa 304. Locally recognized as saint, her feast day is September 2.

== Martyrology ==
Romæ sanctæ Maximæ Mártyris, quæ, simul cum sancto Ansano Christum confessa, in persecutióne Diocletiáni, dum fustibus cæditur, réddidit spíritum.

At Rome, the holy martyr Maxima, who confessed Christ with St. Ansanus in the persecution of Diocletian, and yielded up her soul while being beaten with rods.

— Martyrologium Romanum, 2 September
