= Sabinus of Spoleto =

Late 3rd-century bishop and Christian martyr

Saint Sabinus
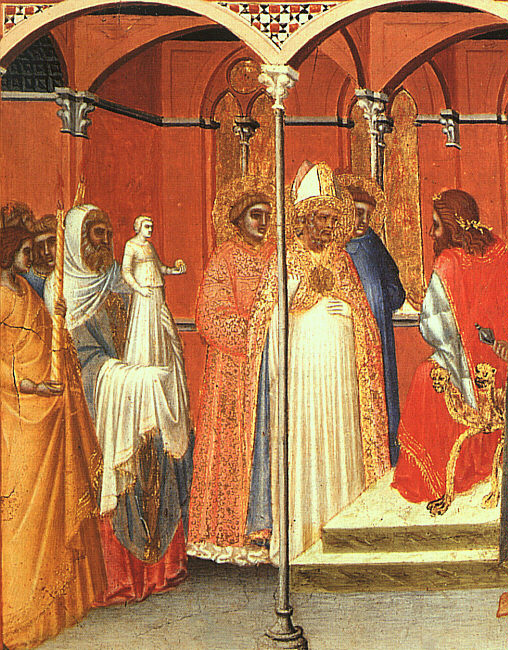
- Saint Sabinus before Venustian, preaching the gospel. Pietro Lorenzetti.

Bishop and Martyr
- Born: 3rd century AD
- Died: c. 303 AD; Spoletium, Roman Umbria (modern-day Spoleto, Umbria, Italy)
- Venerated in: Catholicism; Eastern Orthodoxy
- Canonized: Pre-congregation
- Feast: 30 December in both Catholic and Eastern Orthodox Churches

Sabinus of Spoleto (died c. 303) was a bishop in the early Christian church who resisted the Diocletianic Persecution and was martyred.

== Traditional narrative ==
According to legend, Venustian, governor of Etruria and Umbria, had Sabinus and his deacons arrested in Assisi. Diocletian's order required all Christians to sacrifice to the Roman gods or be put to death; their estates were then to be seized for the state.

Venustian mocked Sabinus's faith, accusing him of leading the people to the worship of a dead man. When Sabinus said that Christ rose on the third day, Venustian invited him to do the same thing. The deacons were in great fear, but Sabinus encouraged them to hold to their faith, and they died after being torn apart by iron hooks. Venustian had Sabinus's hands cut off.

In prison after the martyrdom of his deacons, he was tended by a woman named Serena. While in prison, he healed a man born blind. Venustian heard of the cure and sought a cure for his own eyes from Sabinus. Sabinus healed the governor and converted him to Christianity. Venustian then sheltered Sabinus. Maximianus Herculius, hearing of this, ordered the tribune Lucius to address the matter. Lucius had Venustian, his wife, and his two sons beheaded at Assisi, and he had Sabinus beaten to death at Spoleto.

== Veneration ==
Sabinus's feast day is 30 December in the Eastern Orthodox Church and in the Roman Martyrology of the Catholic Church. (Note: Catholics may commemorate the saint on another day in some communities or locations, according to specific needs or customs of particular churches or national calendars of the Roman Rite.)

He is depicted in the Maestà of Duccio.

The church of San Sabino, dedicated to the saint, is outside Spoleto.

== Other saints of the name ==
The Roman Martyrology lists six saints called Sabinus, three of whom were bishops. The other two are Sabinus of Canosa (died c. 566; feast day, 9 February) and Sabinus of Piacenza (died late 4th century; feast day, 11 December).

== Bibliography ==
- Englebert, Omer. "The Lives of the Saints." Anne and Christopher Fremantle, trans. Nihil obstat 1954. New York: Barnes & Noble, 1994, p. 494-495
