= Pietro Lorenzetti =

Italian painter (1280–1348)

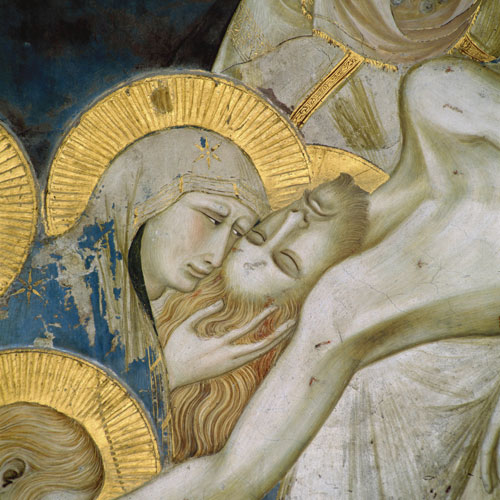
Detail of a fresco in the Basilica of Saint Francis of Assisi, 1310–1329

Pietro Lorenzetti (Italian: [ˈpjɛːtro lorenˈtsetti]; c. 1280 – 1348) or Pietro Laurati was an Italian painter, active between c. 1306 and 1345. Together with his younger brother Ambrogio, he introduced naturalism into Sienese art. In their artistry and experiments with three-dimensional and spatial arrangements, the brothers foreshadowed the art of the Renaissance.

== Overview ==
Little is known of Lorenzetti's life other than that he was (putatively) born in Siena in the late 13th century (c. 1280/90), died there (possibly) in 1348 a victim of the first Black Death pandemic then devastating Europe, and had a younger brother, Ambrogio, also an artist. That the men were brothers was unknown to Vasari because he misread Pietro's surname on a painting in Pistoia's church of San Francesco as "Laurati". Thus the kinship between the artists was missed. Pietro was known to have been a young man in 1306 as he was still being referred to as Petruccio di Lorenzo. However, he was at least 25 at the time because he was paid directly.

Pietro worked in Assisi, Florence, Pistoia, Cortona, and Siena, although the precise chronology is unknown. His work suggests the influence of Duccio (in whose studio he may have worked, possibly alongside Simone Martini), Giotto, and Giovanni Pisano.

According to Vasari, it was Pietro's frescoes which adorned the façade of Siena's Ospedale della Scala that first bought him to the attention of his contemporaries. The frescoes – now believed to be the work of both Lorenzetti brothers – were destroyed in 1720 and subsequently whitewashed over.

Many of his religious works may still be seen in churches and museums in the Tuscan towns of Arezzo, Assisi, and Siena (e.g., his last documented work, the Nativity of the Virgin (c. 1335–1342), is displayed in the Museo dell'Opera del Duomo).

Although Lorenzetti's integration of frame and painted architecture in the Nativity of the Virgin is usually thought to be unique, it is evident in the frescoes of Assisi some decades earlier. One probable conclusion can be made that he did not read Latin, as there was documentation of a translator being paid in association with his work on the Birth of the Virgin.

His masterwork is a fresco decoration of the lower church of the Basilica of San Francesco d'Assisi, where he painted a series of large scenes depicting the Crucifixion, the Deposition from the Cross, and the Entombment. The massed figures in these pieces display emotional interactions, unlike many prior depictions which appear to be iconic agglomerations, as if independent figures had been glued onto a surface, with no compelling relationship to one another. The narrative influence of Giotto's frescoes in the Bardi and Peruzzi Chapels in Santa Croce (Florence) and the Arena Chapel (Padua) can be seen in these and other works of the lower church. The Lorenzetti brothers and their contemporary competitor from Florence, Giotto (but also his followers Bernardo Daddi and Maso di Banco) seeded the Italian pictorial revolution that extracted figures from the gilded ether of Byzantine iconography into pictorial worlds of towns, land, and air. Sienese iconography, generally more mystical and fantastic than that of the more naturalistic Florentines, sometimes resembles a modern surrealist landscape.

== Works ==
=== Castiglione d'Orcia Madonna ===
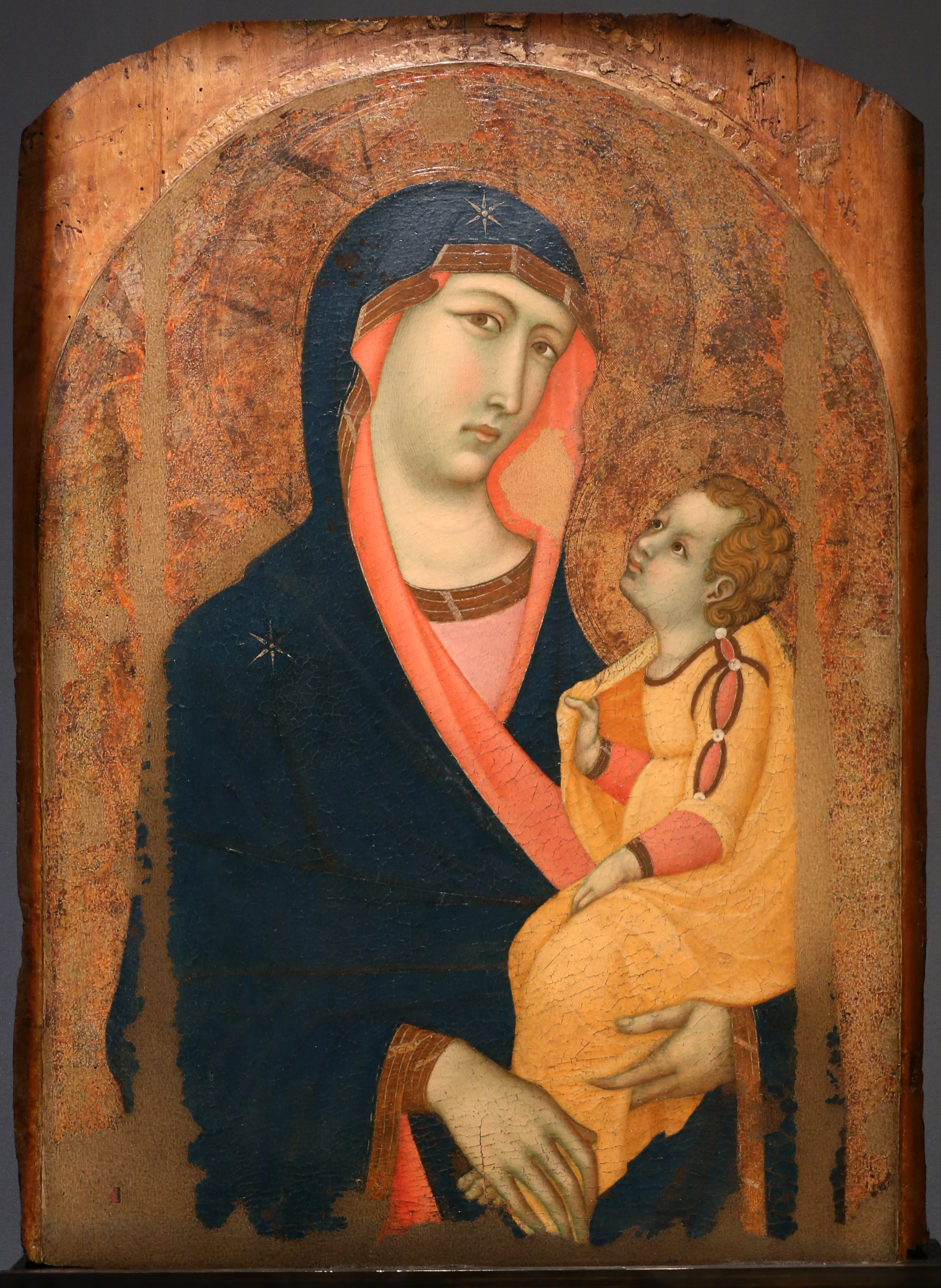
Castiglione d'Orcia Madonna

The Madonna of Castiglione d'Orcia was painted prior to 1300 and is as such Lorenzetti's earliest extant work. In it, the figures are restrained, the mood reflective. The Child's dress is contemporary and elegant; the Virgin wears a deep blue cloak boarded by a Byzantine gold-striated band.

Much about the piece is traditional: the Virgin's head sits along the vertical axis which crosses her right eye, itself gazing at the viewer (the same arrangement is found in Duccio's Rucellai Madonna), the tilts of the Virgin's and Child's faces (the Child gazes up at his mother whose head tilts toward her son but whose eyes remain steadfastly fixed toward the viewer) echo Duccio's earlier Madonnas such as his Madonna and Child in the Metropolitan Museum of Art.

And yet there is something new in Lorenzetti's Madonna, for it has a realism largely absent in Duccio. Here, the Virgin's body responds 'realistically' to the weight of the Child. In earlier depictions of the Virgin and Child by Duccio the Virgin's posture remains unaffected by the realistic influences of weight and poise. The type of secure holding that Lorenzetti depicts in this painting is unprecedented in a painting, but it can be found in previous sculptures of Virgin and Child, from where Lorenzetti could have adapted it.

=== Basilica of Saint Francis of Assisi ===
Perhaps Lorenzetti's most ambitious work is the Passion fresco cycle in the left transept of the Lower Church of San Francesco in Assisi. These seventeen well-preserved frescoes – the highpoint of his early career – show "the influence of Giotto's monumentality, the impulse of Pisano, thirteenth century Expressionism ... and the teachings of Duccio". The conditions for the execution of the frescoes must have been difficult as very little natural light would be available and the lower church would be near darkness. The exact timeline of the frescoes is in question; some scholars have believed that the cycle was painted in sections over several years as the style had some similarities to Lorenzetti's Carmelite Altarpiece (commissioned in 1329). The reasons are varied, from painting only in the dry season to the bloody skirmishes in the area at the time. The more recent technical and stylistic evidence presented by Maginnis poses strong arguments that Lorenzetti's Passion Cycle was completed in one campaign between the years 1316 or 1317 and 1319.

Believed to be one of his earliest works is the Madonna and Child with Saints Francis and John the Baptist, in the chapel of Saint John the Baptist. According to Maginnis the "finest and most complete realization of the ambition to conjoin real and painted space was left to Pietro Lorenzetti, working in the left transept. There, his well-known fictive altar-piece is, in reality, much more."

Lorenzetti's fresco cycle begins with the Entry into Jerusalem, the Last Supper, the Washing of the Feet, the Capture of Christ, the Flagellation and the Way to Calvary. As usual with frescoes, these first scenes were painted beginning at the top of the vaulted roof and working to the bottom so as to avoid dripping from above onto a freshly painted scene.

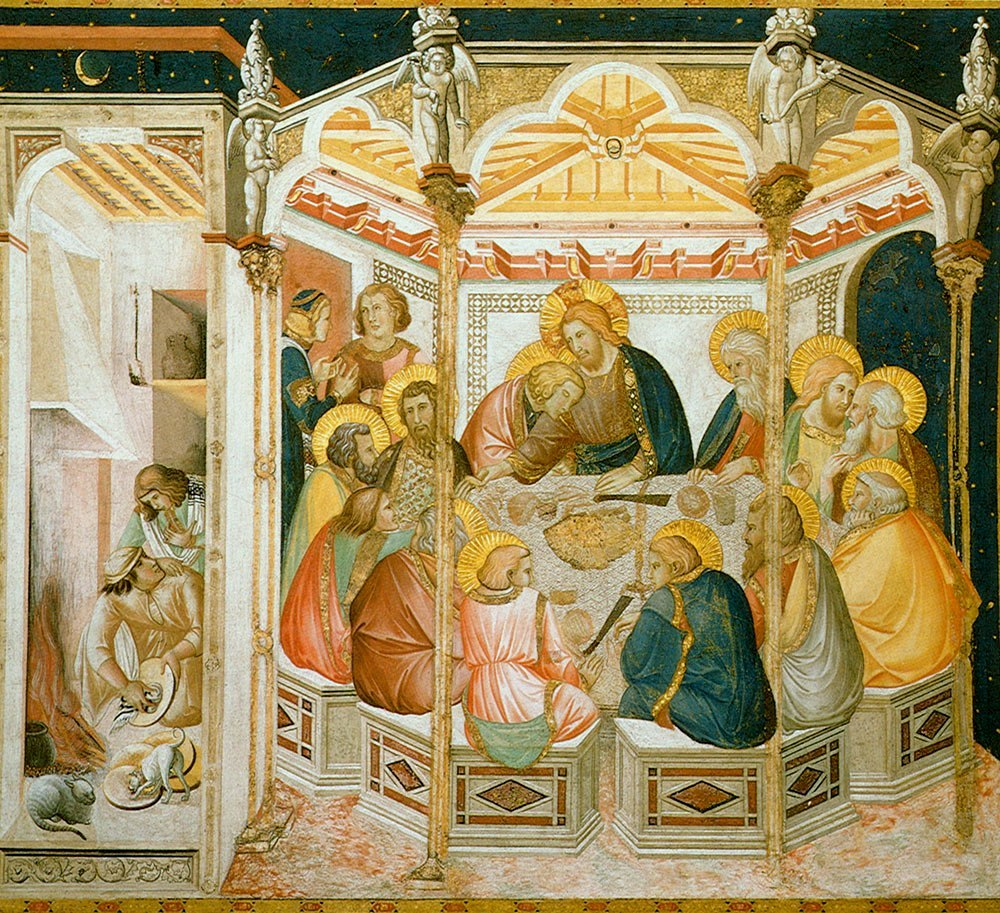
Last Supper, Basilica of San Francesco d'Assisi

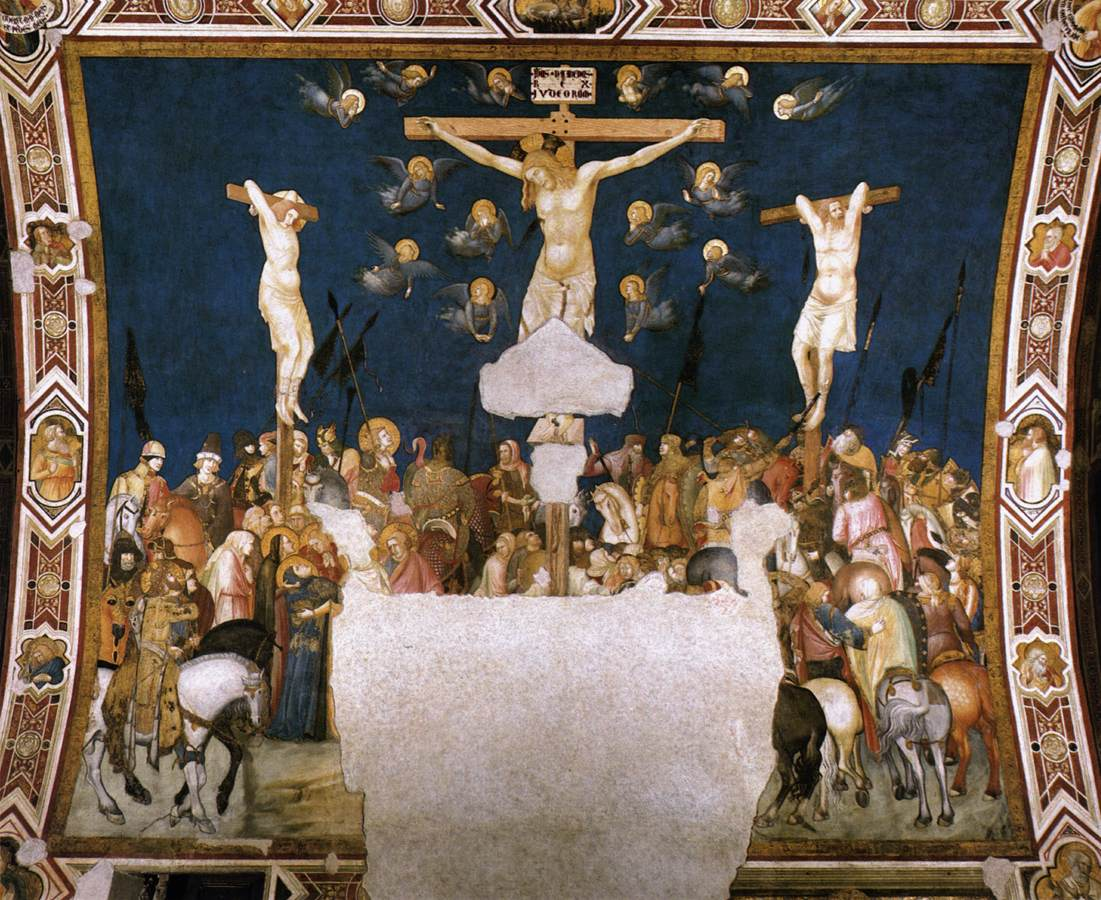
Crucifixion, Basilica of San Francesco d'Assisi

The Last Supper has Christ and his disciples seated around an awkwardly angled table within a refulgent rotunda under a night sky festooned with shooting stars and a crescent moon. To the left of the holy diners is a narrow kitchen and in it is a man doing dishes, a woman at his shoulder, a dog licking the last scraps from a plate, and a cat asleep. The pets and plates cast shadows at angles determined by their relation to the fire.

Two scenes on the end wall, the Deposition from the Cross and the Deposition in the Tomb, show the mourners lovingly removing Christ from the cross and placing, with slow measured movements, his lifeless body in the tomb. This demonstrates Lorenzetti's technical ability and maturity, resembling Giotto's use of naturalistic human emotions.

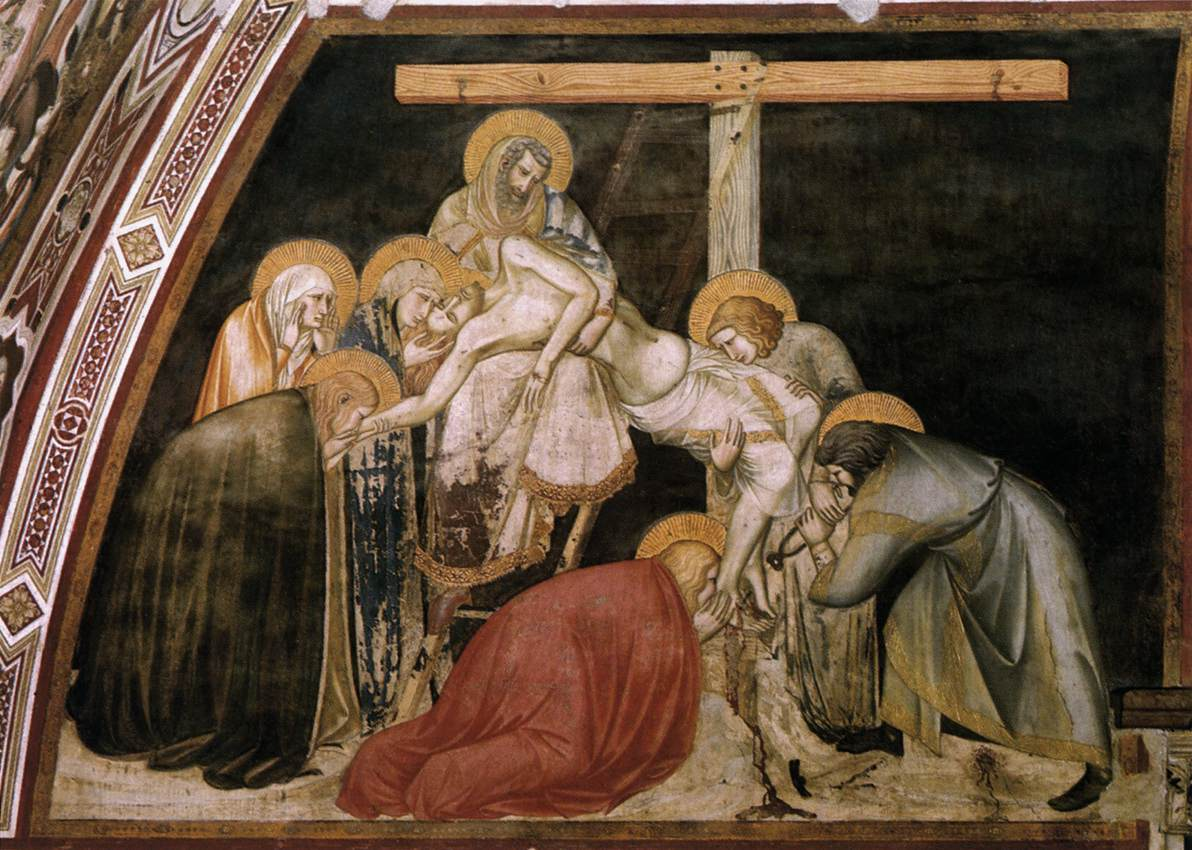
Deposition from the Cross, Basilica of San Francesco d'Assisi

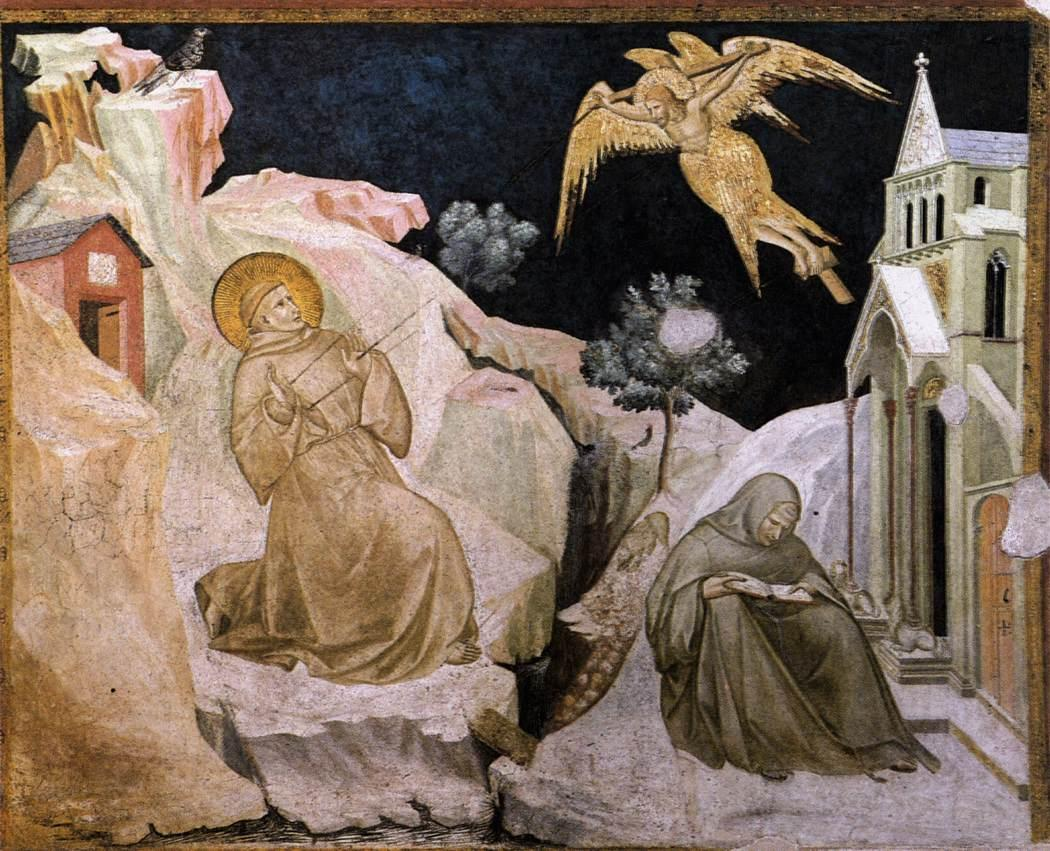
Stigmata of Saint Francis, Basilica of San Francesco d'Assisi

The Suicide of Judas is painted on the facing wall, at the corner between the entrance to the transept at the top of the stairs, where it is painted as to appear part of the architecture of the transept. This is the only fresco with an inscription (scariotas).

In front of the Crucifixion is the Stigmata of Saint Francis. The portrayal of the life of Saint Francis appears in the nave of the church, suggesting a parallel between the life of Christ and that of Francis. Lorenzetti carries the idea further by placing Saint Francis next to the Capture of Christ, replacing the Agony in the Garden from the original Passion story with a scene of the Saint.

The upper scenes on the same wall and the final two stories of the Passion cycle, the Descent of Christ to Limbo and the Resurrection are horn-shaped in a small difficult space. The two scenes represent examples of similar styles to the first six scenes, especially the face of Christ.

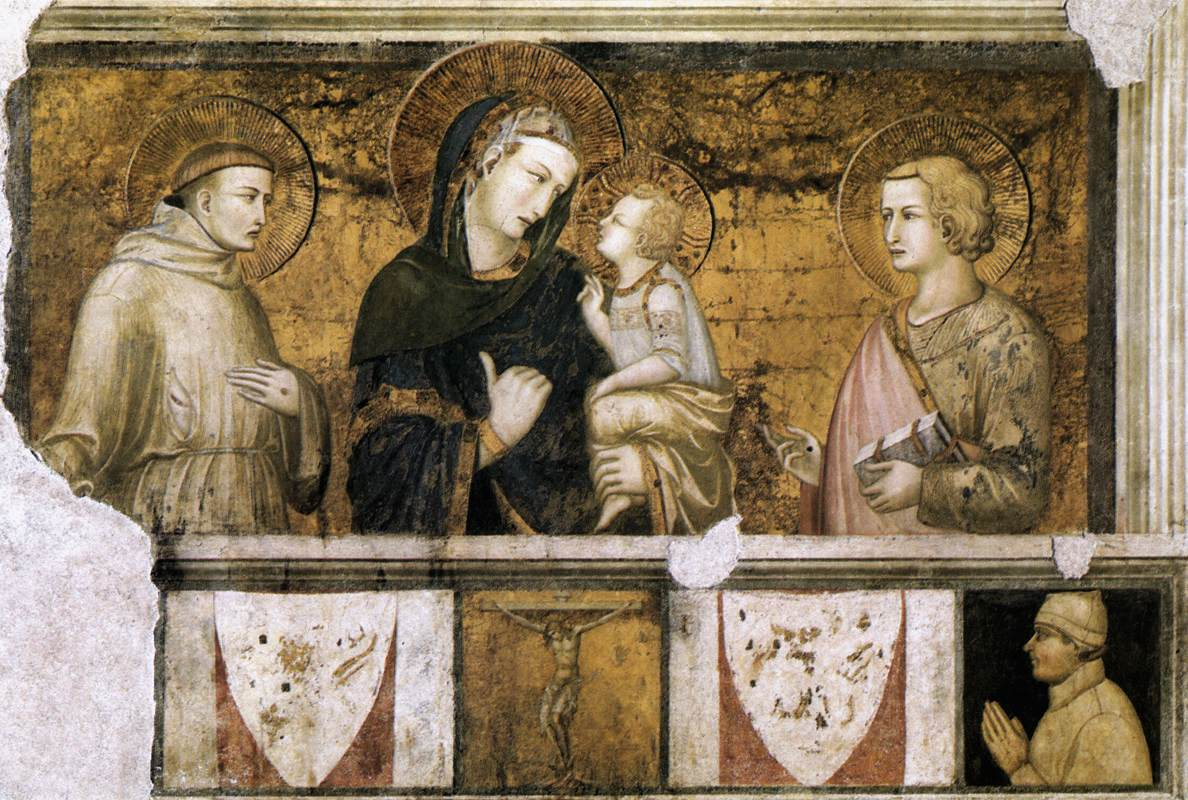
Madonna with Saints Francis and John the Evangelist (Madonna dei Tramonti), Basilica of San Francesco d'Assisi

The Madonna dei Tramonti ("Madonna of the Sunsets") below the Crucifixion in a painted frame shows the Madonna and Child, Saint John the Evangelist, and Saint Francis. Mary has a unique gesture, holding her thumb up pointing back to Saint Francis, raising his hand to accept his calling.

The last image of Lozenzetti's Assisi frescoes, portraits of Saints Rufinus of Assisi, Catherine of Alexandria, Clare of Assisi, and Margaret the Virgin, appear above a bench with an artistic illusion, appearing three-dimensional. The end of the bench casts a shadow following the form of the painted moldings. There is only one light source and the painted shadow appears to be cast by it.

=== Monticchiello Altarpiece ===
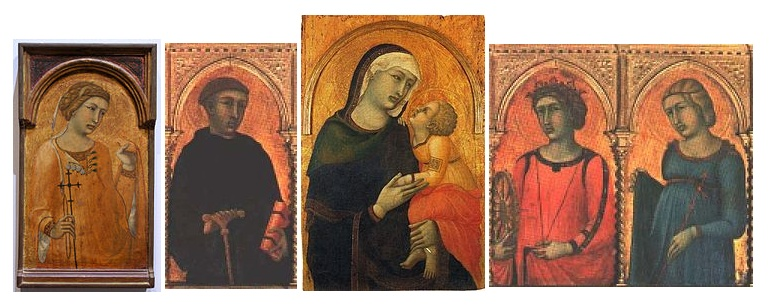
Monticchiello Altarpiece

The Monticchiello Altarpiece is a hypothetical altarpiece of c. 1315 for the parish church of Santi Leonardo e Cristoforo in Monticchiello, Tuscany. It is thought to have consisted of the Monticchiello Madonna (Diocesan Museum of Pienza), Saint Margaret or Saint Agatha (Musée de Tessé, Le Mans) and Saint Leonard or Benedict, Saint Catherine of Alexandria and Saint Agatha or Saint Margaret (Museo Horne, Florence).

=== Arezzo Polyptych ===
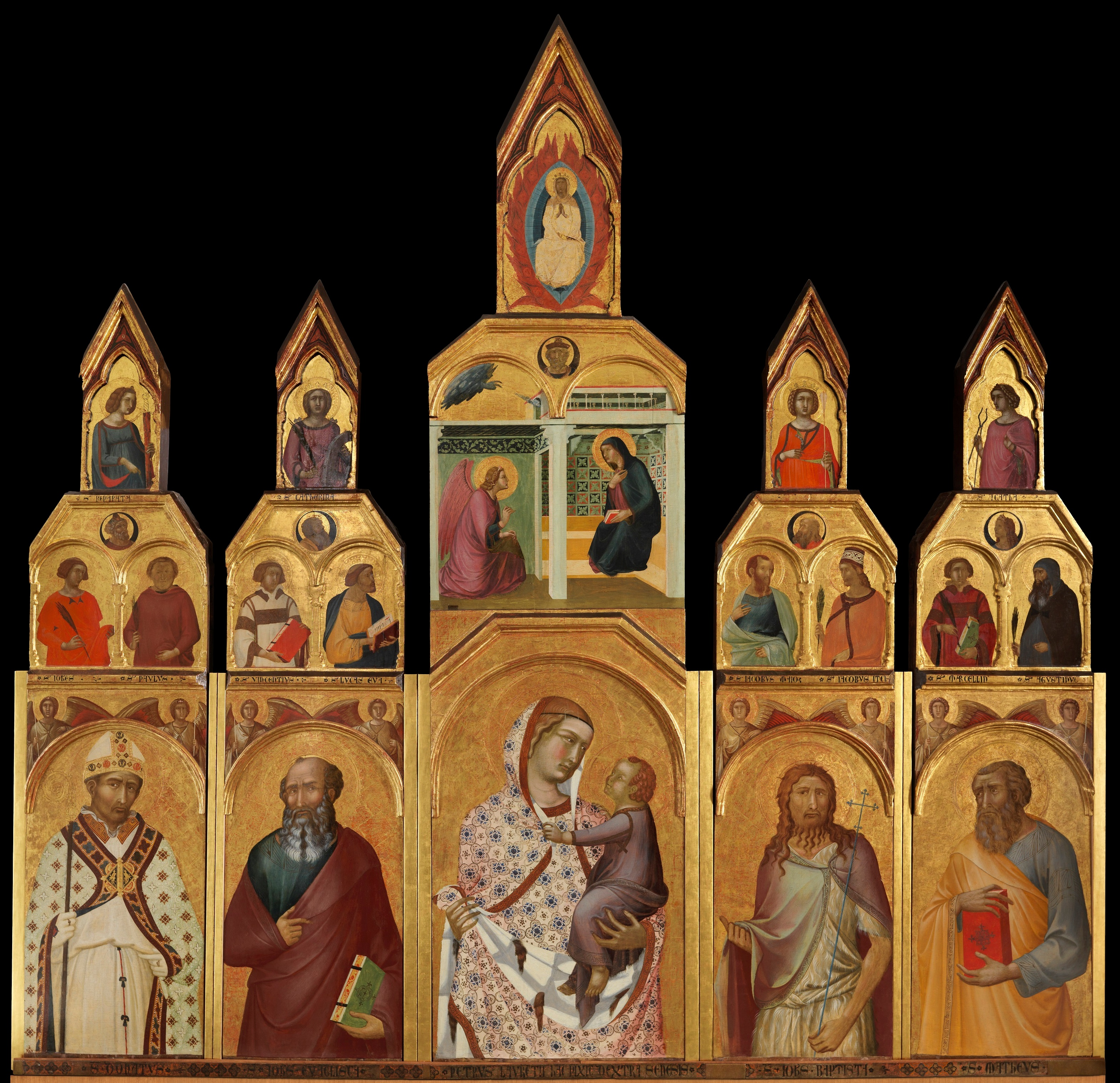
Arezzo Polyptych, 1320. Arezzo, Santa Maria della Pieve.

The gilded three-story altarpiece, the Arezzo (or Aretine or Tarlati) Polyptych, was commissioned in 1320 by Bishop Guido Tarlati for the Santa Maria della Pieve in Arezzo. At its centre is the Madonna (draped in a magnificent ermine-lined robe) and Child, flanked by the saints John the Evangelist, John the Baptist, Matthew, and Donatus (Arezzo's patron saint, martyred in 361 CE). The rich colours, graceful lines, decorative detail, and supple figures (suggestive of Martini's influence), endow the piece with "a vivacity rare in contemporary Sienese art".

The polyptych is Lorenzetti's first dated work (c. 1320–1324) and one of only four with verifiable documentation including the Carmelite Altarpiece, the Uffizi Madonna, and the Birth of the Virgin. "The dating has allowed scholars to identify with precision a specific stage of the painter's activity and style."

=== Carmelite Altarpiece ===
The Carmelite Altarpiece was a polyptych commissioned in 1329 for the friars of the Carmelite Order. It consisted of a central panel depicting the Madonna and Child with Saint Nicholas and Elijah. The side panels displayed Saints Agnes, John the Baptist, and Catherine, and Elisha. The predella below comprised five narrative paintings. Instead of taking their subject from the Bible, these five paintings show events from the history of the Carmelite Order. A striking feature of the overall design is the broad central panel of the predella, which allowed the painter to depict the consignment of the Carmelite rule in the early thirteenth century in a particularly detailed manner. The significance of Elijah in the Carmelite altarpiece is that he was held to be the founder of the Carmelite order. For the Carmelite friars Elijah is the most significant saint besides the Virgin. The Carmelite altarpiece's illusion of three-dimensional forms marks a new phase in Lorenzetti's style.

The Carmelite altarpiece was sold in 1818 and subsequently lost. It was found when the Asano Madonna was restored to its original state, revealing Lorenzetti's altarpiece underneath. Two clues to restorers that the Asano Madonna was in fact the Carmelite altarpiece were the uncovering of Elijah hidden under a later rendering of Saint Anthony for the Asano order<--no sign of any order of that name-->, and the Carmelite colors of the costumes worn by the painted figures. The panel is signed and dated on the step of the throne: PETRUS LAURENTII ME PINXIT ANNO DOMINI MCCCXXVIII.

=== Birth of the Virgin ===
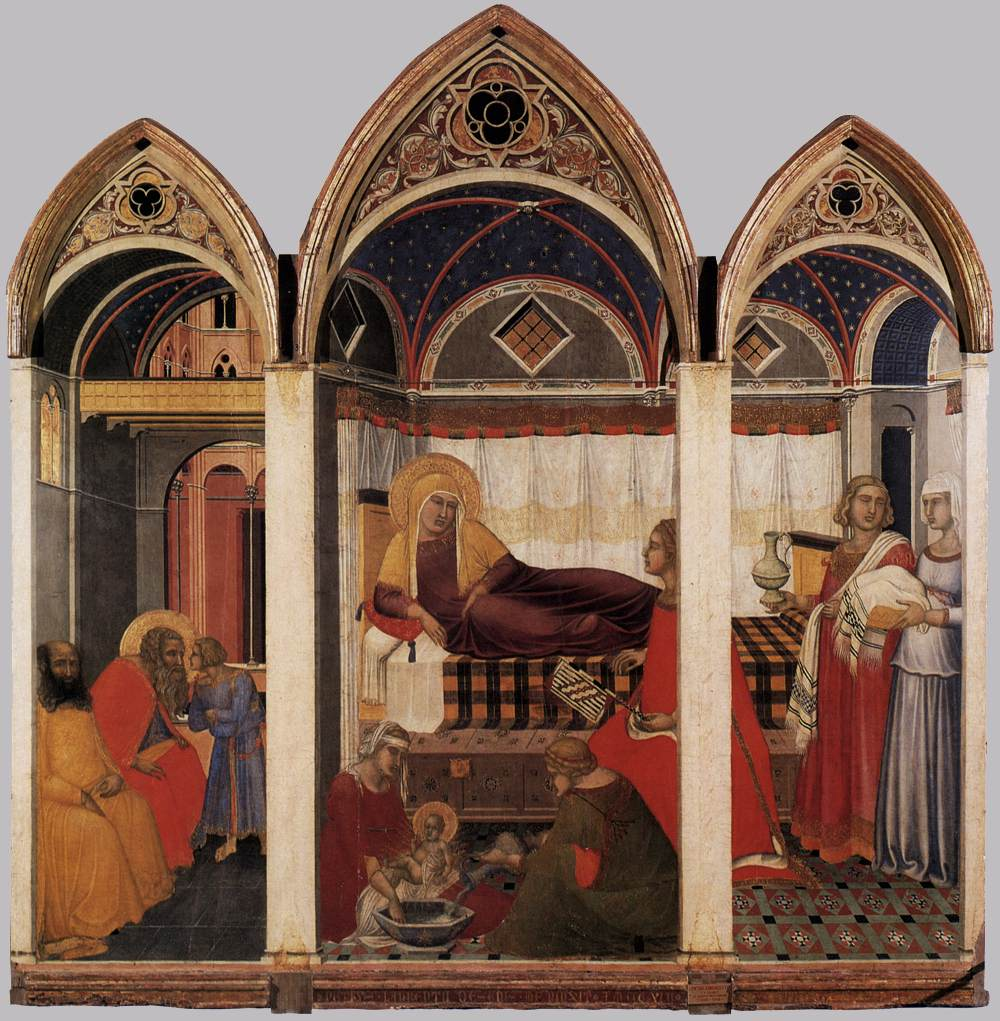
Birth of the Virgin, 1342. Siena, Museo dell'Opera del Duomo

Lorenzetti's last major work (1342) was a triptych altarpiece, the Birth of the Virgin, commissioned for Siena Cathedral. This painting in tempera on panel, like many Sienese paintings of the time, celebrates the life of the Virgin, the city's patron saint.

The Birth of the Virgin was the third painting in a series completed for Siena Cathedral, beginning with Duccio's Maestà and including Simone Martini's Annunciation. Duccio, Simone, and Pietro were all members of the Sienese School. Duccio's high altarpiece, the Maestà, was commissioned in 1308. According to Timothy Hyman, the Maestà was "part of the Commune's wider programme to promote and strengthen Siena's civic identity". The central panel of the Maestà honors the Virgin through the depiction of The Virgin and Christ Enthroned in Majesty with Angels and Saints. As Hyman writes, if a viewer compares Duccio's Maestà with Pietro's Birth of the Virgin, one can "...recognize Pietro's colour-world as startlingly different: dense, saturated, opaque, planar".

Martini's Annunciation was completed in 1333 and displayed beside Duccio's Maestà. Again, the Virgin is glorified in Martini's altarpiece, which depicts the Annunciation, or the angel Gabriel's announcement to the Virgin Mary that she will become the mother of Jesus. As Hyman states when comparing Duccio's Maestà with Simone's Annunciation, "Simone's blue-mantled figure silhouetted against the gold was both an echo and a rupture; the still icon transformed into narrative, the hieratic divinity swept up into dramatic action."

While Duccio's Maestà and Simone's Annunciation were displayed behind the choir screen, Pietro's Birth of the Virgin was on view in the central part of Siena Cathedral. In contrast to Duccio's regal depiction of the Virgin in the Maestà, and Simone's Annunciation with a scene that appears supernatural, the Birth of the Virgin is notable for Pietro's representation of the Virgin in a corporeal setting. In this scene, a bath is being poured for the Virgin, midwives attend Saint Anne, who lounges on a plaid blanket-covered bed, and an expectant father awaits news of the birth. The figures are modeled and solid. Although the holy persons are signified with crowns of light, they appear otherwise terrestrial. If not for their crowns of light, and Saint Anne's unnaturally large body, this painting could be interpreted as a genre painting depicting the everyday lives of ordinary people. If one compares this intimate household scene adorned with richly colored textiles to the gold groundwork that creates an otherworldly effect in Simone's Annunciation, one quickly notices that Pietro has created a more accessible Virgin. A small panel in the Abegg-Stiftung, Riggisberg, which has been attributed to either Pietro or Ambrogio Lorenzetti, similarly depicts the Holy Family in a domestic setting with Mary engaged in needlework or knitting, the Christ Child clinging to her and Joseph beside them and a plaid cover on a bed in the left side chamber.

Perhaps one of the most extraordinary qualities of Birth of the Virgin is Pietro's use of spatial illusion. It is likely that Pietro was influenced by the work of his brother, Ambrogio Lorenzetti. As Keith Christiansen states, "the key impetus to his experiments with centralized spatial projection was doubtless his collaboration with Ambrogio, with whom he shared workshop materials". Pietro creates a seamless architectural world with the integration of the frame and picture plane. The vertical columns and bed frame running parallel to the picture plane create a planar composition. In addition, Pietro's rendering of the vaulted ceilings adds dimension to the rooms and encloses this intimate scene. Depth is further generated in the left panel of the triptych, as the viewer peers outside the waiting room to see a nearby building. As Hyman affirms, the "[Birth of the Virgin] reads both as a triptych ... and as a deep, unified space—the most convincing interior space of the entire fourteenth century." Pietro's innovative use of spatial illusion in the Birth of the Virgin solidifies his place amongst the great masters of trecento Sienese art such as Duccio di Buonisegna, Ambrogio Lorenzetti, and Simone Martini.

== References and sources ==
Giorgio Vasari includes a biography of Lorenzetti in his Lives.
