= Crescentius of Rome =

Saint

Saint Crescentius
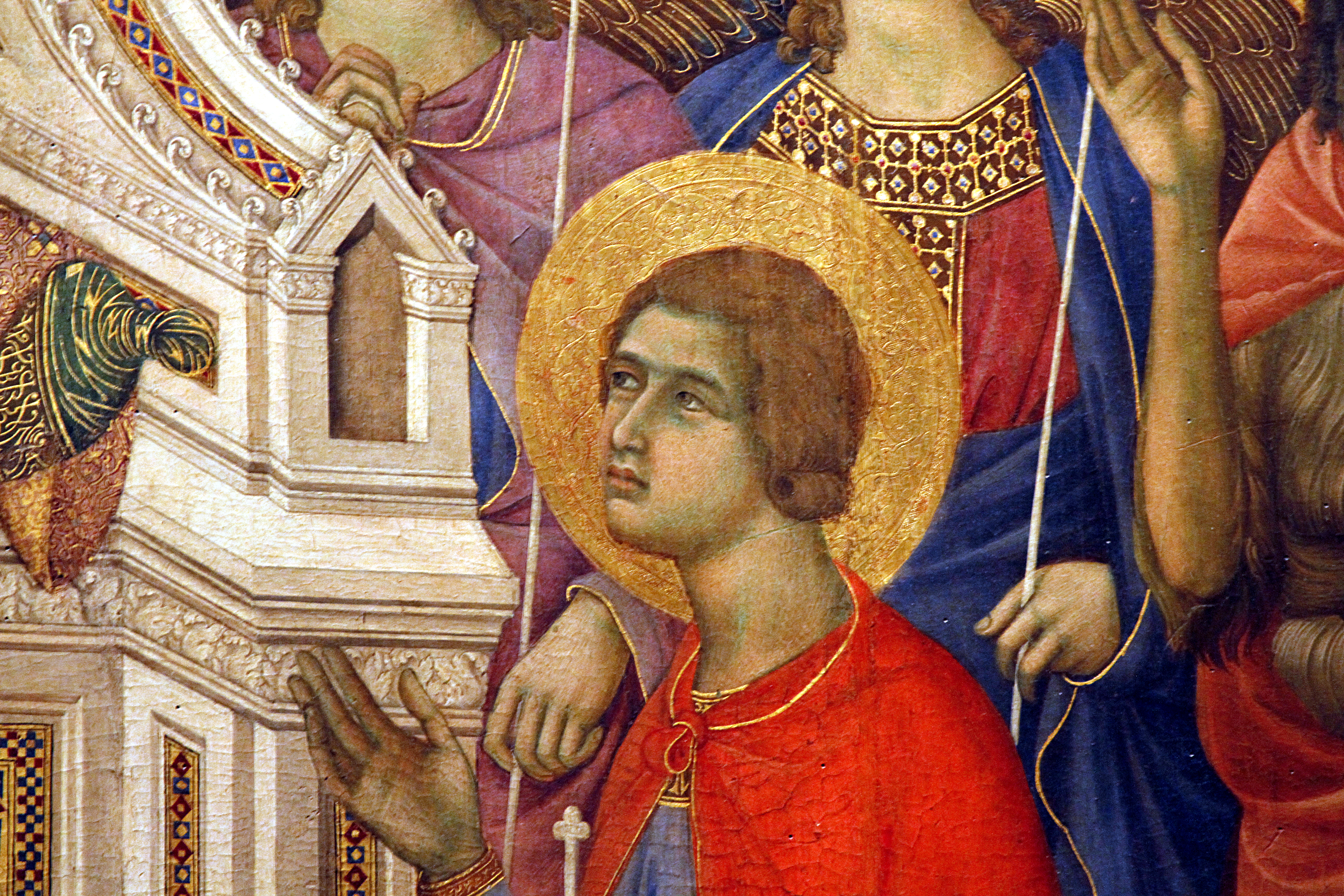
- Saint Crescentius, Maestà of Duccio.
- Born: ~292 AD
- Died: ~303 AD; Via Salaria, Rome
- Venerated in: Roman Catholic Church; Eastern Orthodox Church
- Feast: September 14; October 12 (translation of relics)
- Patronage: Siena

Crescentius of Rome (Italian: San Crescenzio di Roma) is venerated as a child martyr by the Roman Catholic Church.

According to tradition, he was born of a noble Roman family and was baptized along with his parents by Epigmenius. During the persecutions of Christians by Diocletian, the family fled to Perugia, where his father Euthymius died. Led back to Rome, Crescentius, who was eleven years old, was beheaded on the via Salaria, outside of the city walls.

== Veneration ==
He was buried in the cemetery of Priscilla on the Via Salaria. His place of burial became a focus of pilgrimage and veneration in the Middle Ages. His body was translated from Rome to Siena around 1058 by Pope Stephen IX at the request of Bishop Antifredus. Other relics were translated to Tortosa in 1606.

The only biographical source concerning Crescentius was derived from the copy of a manuscript from 1600 and conserved in the Biblioteca Vallicelliana. The Acta is not reliable as it was written long after the alleged death of this saint, probably around 1058, when the body of Crescentius was translated to Siena. During the Middle Ages, Crescentius was the subject of a popular cult in Siena.

He is depicted in the Maestà of Duccio.
