= Maestà (Duccio) =

Dismantled altarpiece from Siena Cathedral

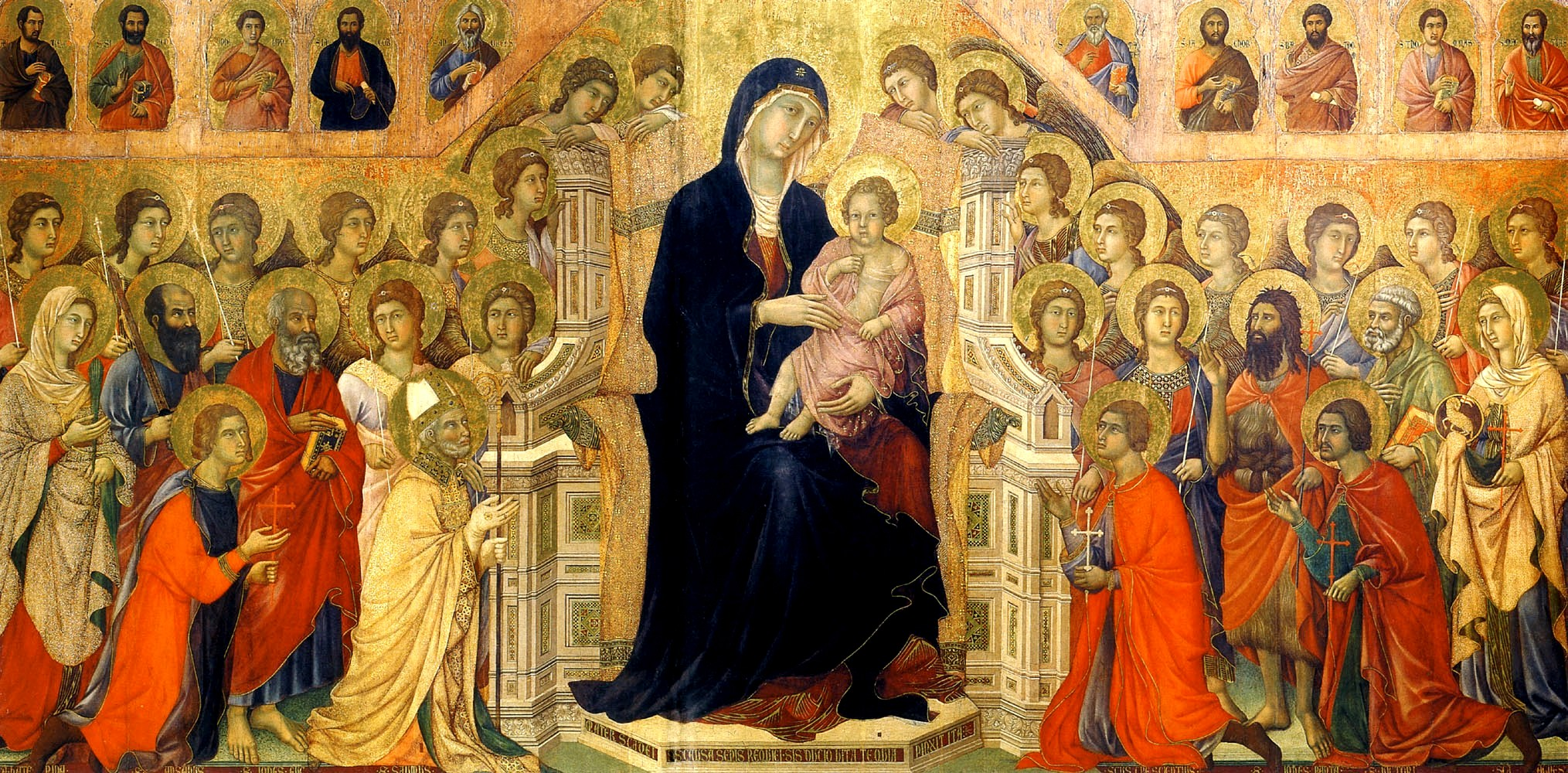
- Artist: Duccio di Buoninsegna
- Year: 1308–1311
- Type: Tempera and gold on wood
- Dimensions: 213 cm × 396 cm (84 in × 156 in)
- Location: Museo dell'Opera Metropolitana del Duomo, Siena

The Maestà, or Maestà of Duccio, is an altarpiece composed of many separate paintings commissioned from Duccio di Buoninsegna by the city of Siena in Tuscany in 1308 and is his major work. Duccio's Maestà was the first altarpiece to have both a front and back side. The front panels make up a large enthroned Madonna and Child with saints and angels, and a predella of the Childhood of Christ with prophets.

The reverse showed, in forty-three small panels, scenes from the Life of the Virgin and the Life of Christ, and were topped by and additional six panels showing angels. Several panels are now dispersed or lost. The base of the panel has an inscription that reads (in translation): "Holy Mother of God, be thou the cause of peace for Siena and life to Duccio because he painted thee thus." Though it took a generation for its effect to be truly felt, Duccio's Maestà set Italian painting on a course leading away from the hieratic representations of the Italo-Byzantine style and towards more direct presentations of reality, as developed by leading figures such as Giotto during the Trecento.

== History ==
With the help of assistants, Duccio di Buoninsegna painted the work in a studio located on Via Stalloreggi, very close to Siena Cathedral. The painting was installed in the cathedral on 9 June 1311 after a procession of the work in a loop around the city. One person who witnessed this event wrote:

And on that day when it was brought into the cathedral, all workshops remained closed, and the bishop commanded a great host of devoted priests and monks to file past in solemn procession. This was accompanied by all the high officers of the Commune and by all the people; all honorable citizens of Siena surrounded said panel with candles held in their hands, and women and children followed humbly behind. They accompanied the panel amidst the glorious pealing of bells after a solemn procession on the Piazza del Campo into the very cathedral; and all this out of reverence for the costly panel… The poor received many alms, and we prayed to the Holy Mother of God, our patron saint, that she might in her infinite mercy preserve this our city of Siena from every misfortune, traitor, or enemy.

Along with the central figures of The Virgin and the Christ Child, also depicted are the following saints: John the Evangelist (to the left of the throne); Saint Paul; Catherine of Alexandria; John the Baptist (to the right of the throne); Saint Peter; Mary Magdalene, and Saint Agnes. In the foreground are Siena's various patron saints: Saint Ansanus; Saint Sabinus; Saint Crescentius; and Saint Victor.

Creating this altarpiece assembled from many wood panels bonded together before painting was an arduous undertaking. The work was not only large, the central panel being 7 by 13 feet, but also required painting on both sides to allow it to be seen from both directions when installed on the main altar at the centre of the sanctuary.

=== Dismantling and current locations ===
The altarpiece remained in place until 1771, when it was dismantled in order to distribute the pieces between two altars. The 5-metre-high (16 ft) construction was dismantled and sawn up, and the paintings damaged in the process. Pieces went astray, either by being sold off or simply lost. Partial restoration took place in 1956. Extant remains of the altarpiece not at Siena are divided among several other museums in Europe and the United States.

The panels in Siena are housed in the Duomo museum adjacent to the Duomo di Siena. The central panel, lower panels, and rear are displayed separately in the same room.

== List of panels ==
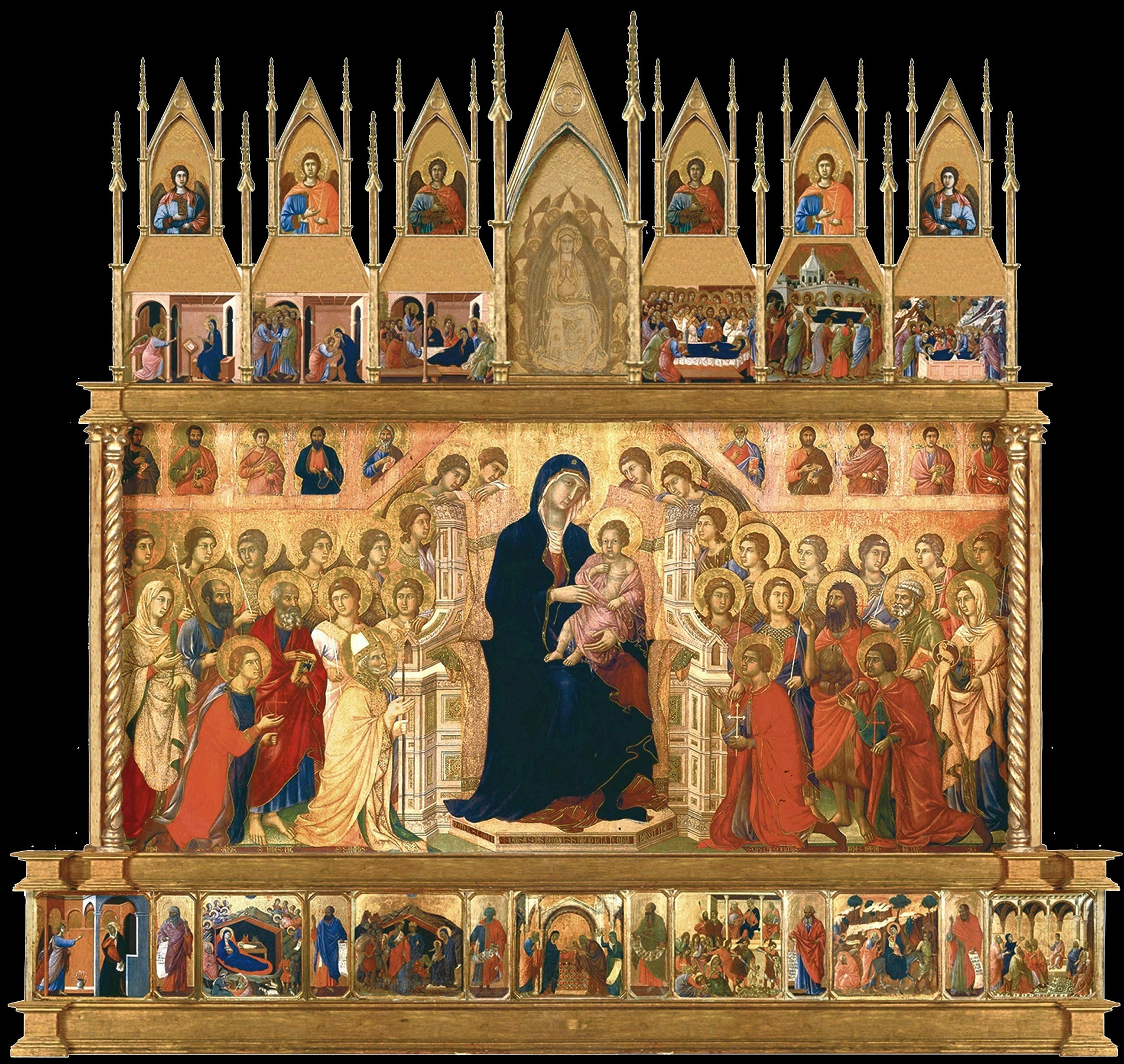
Reconstruction of the front

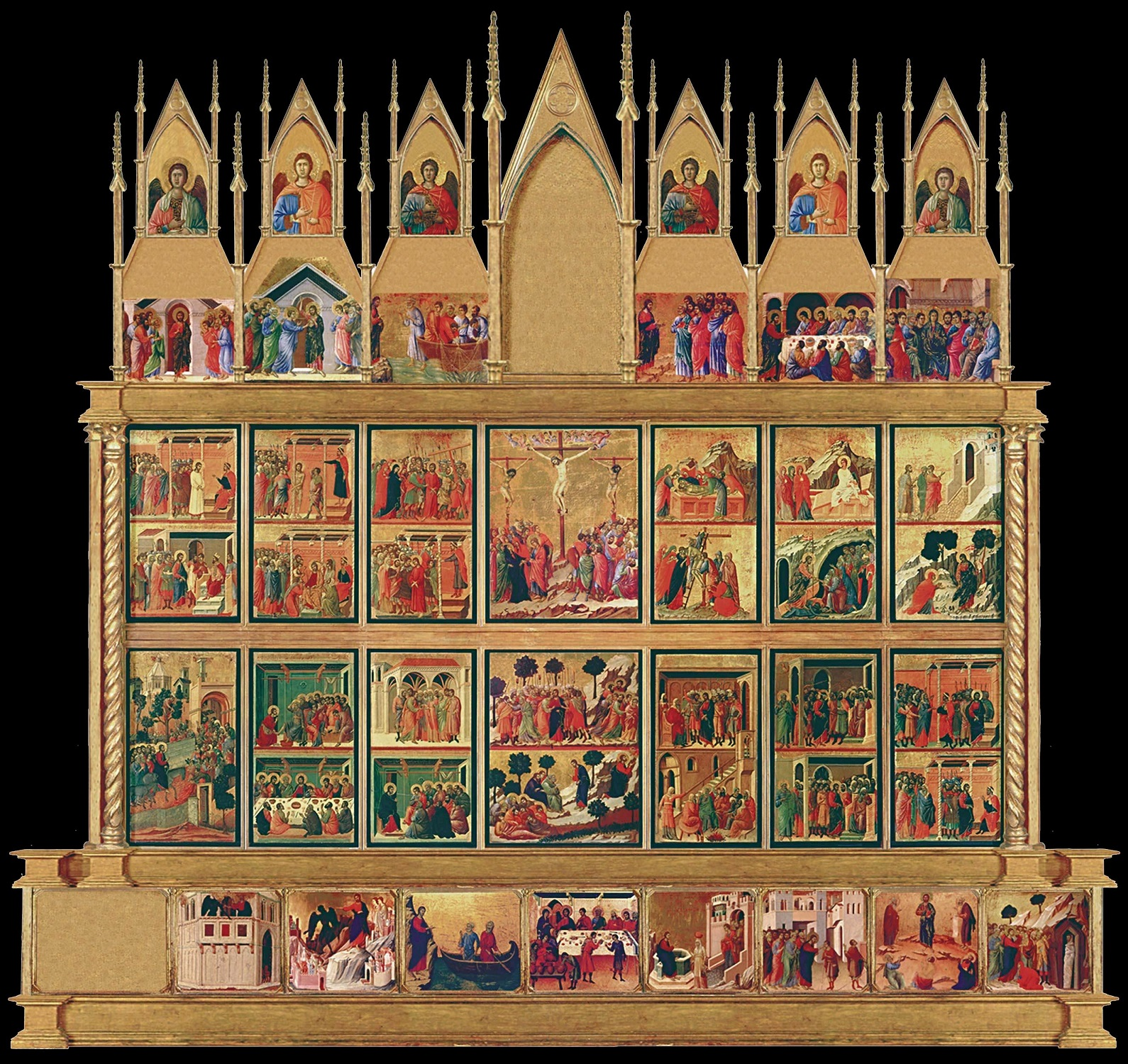
Reconstruction of the reverse

All panels are displayed at the Museo dell'Opera del Duomo in Siena, unless noted otherwise. (The list reads from top left to bottom right.)

Front side

- Central panel
  - The Mother of God Enthroned with the Christ Child Amidst Angels and Saints (the actual Maestà)
- Six panels on top (beneath six half-figures of angels, and a lost central panel of Mary)
  - The Annunciation of the Virgin's death
  - The Virgin's Farewell to St. John
  - The Virgin's Farewell to the Apostles
  - The Death of the Virgin
  - The Funeral of the Virgin
  - The Burial of the Virgin
  - Angel (formerly in the Stoclet Collection, Brussels)
  - Angel (Philadelphia Museum of Art, Philadelphia)
- Predella (seven scenes with six interjacent prophets)
  - The Annunciation (National Gallery, London)
  - Isaiah / Nativity / Ezekiel (Andrew W. Mellon Collection, National Gallery of Art, Washington, DC)
  - The Adoration of the Magi; Solomon
  - The Presentation in the Temple; the prophet Malachi
  - The Massacre of the Innocents; the prophet Jeremiah
  - The Flight into Egypt; the prophet Hosea
  - The Boy Jesus among the Doctors

Back side

- Top row with six scenes of the Life of Christ (beneath six half-figures of angels, and a lost central panel)
  - The Appearance of Christ behind closed doors
  - The Incredulity of St. Thomas
  - The Appearance of Christ on Lake Tiberias
  - The Appearance of Christ on the Mountain in Galilee
  - The Last Supper
  - The Pentecost
  - Angel (Mount Holyoke College, South Hadley, Massachusetts)
- Center of the altarpiece consisting of 14 panels with 26 episodes from Christ's Passion
- Predella with nine scenes of the Life of Christ
  - First on the left is lost
  - The Temptation of Christ atop the Temple
  - Temptation of Christ on the Mountain (Frick Collection, New York)
  - Calling of SS. Peter and Andrew (Samuel H. Kress Collection, National Gallery of Art, Washington DC)
  - The Wedding Feast of Cana
  - Christ and the Samaritan Woman (Museo Thyssen-Bornemisza, Madrid)
  - Healing of the Blind Man (National Gallery, London)
  - The Transfiguration (National Gallery, London)
  - The Raising of Lazarus (Kimbell Art Museum, Fort Worth, Texas)

== See also ==
- Life of Jesus in the New Testament
