= Ansanus =

Patron saint of Siena, Italy (died 304)

Saint Ansanus
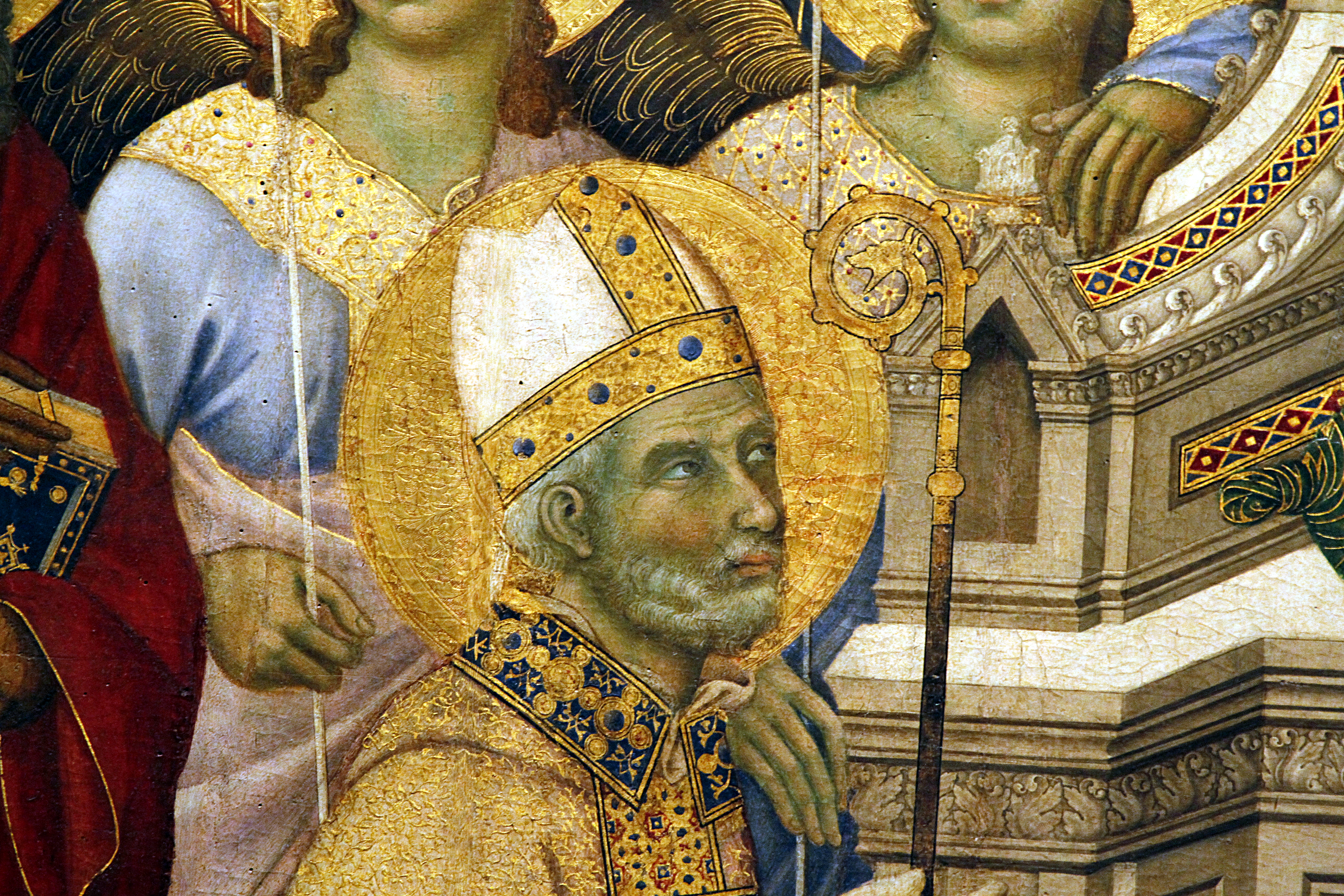
- St Ansanus, Maestà by Duccio

Martyr
- Born: c. 285
- Died: c. 304; Siena
- Venerated in: Eastern Orthodox Church; Roman Catholic Church
- Feast: 1 December (the day of his martyrdom)
- Attributes: depicted as a young man holding a cluster of dates; holding a heart or liver; palm of martyrdom; heart with IHS; depicted being boiled in oil or beheaded; banner bearing the arms of Siena; baptismal cup; fountain
- Patronage: Siena, Italy

Saint Ansanus (Italian: Sant'Ansano) (died 304 AD), called The Baptizer or The Apostle of Siena, is the patron saint of Siena, Italy and a scion of the Anician family of Rome.

== Legend ==
His legend states that he was born of a noble Roman family in the third century. While still a child, Ansanus was secretly baptized by his nurse Maxima (venerated as St. Maxima of Rome) and was secretly brought up as a Christian. Ansanus openly declared his Christian faith during the persecutions of Diocletian, when he was nineteen years old. According to tradition, St. Ansanus preached the Gospel in Bagnoregio (then Bagnorea) and the church of Santa Maria delle Carceri outside the Alban Gate was said to have been built above the prison in which he was confined.

According to tradition, Ansanus and Maxima were scourged; Maxima died from this. Ansanus, however, survived this torture, as well as the next one: being thrown into a pot of boiling oil. He was then taken to the city of Siena as a prisoner. He managed to preach Christianity there and make many converts to this religion. He was decapitated by order of Roman Emperor Diocletian.

It is also said that his own father denounced him to the authorities, but Ansanus managed to escape, and converted many at Bagnorea and later at Siena.

== Veneration ==
He was venerated as one of the patron saints of Siena. He is depicted in the Maestà of Duccio.

== Sources ==
- Ferguson, George (1961). Signs and Symbols in Christian Art. London: Oxford University Press. p. 104. ISBN 0-19-501432-4.
