= Piazza del Mercato, Siena =

Square in Siena, Italy

Piazza del Mercato
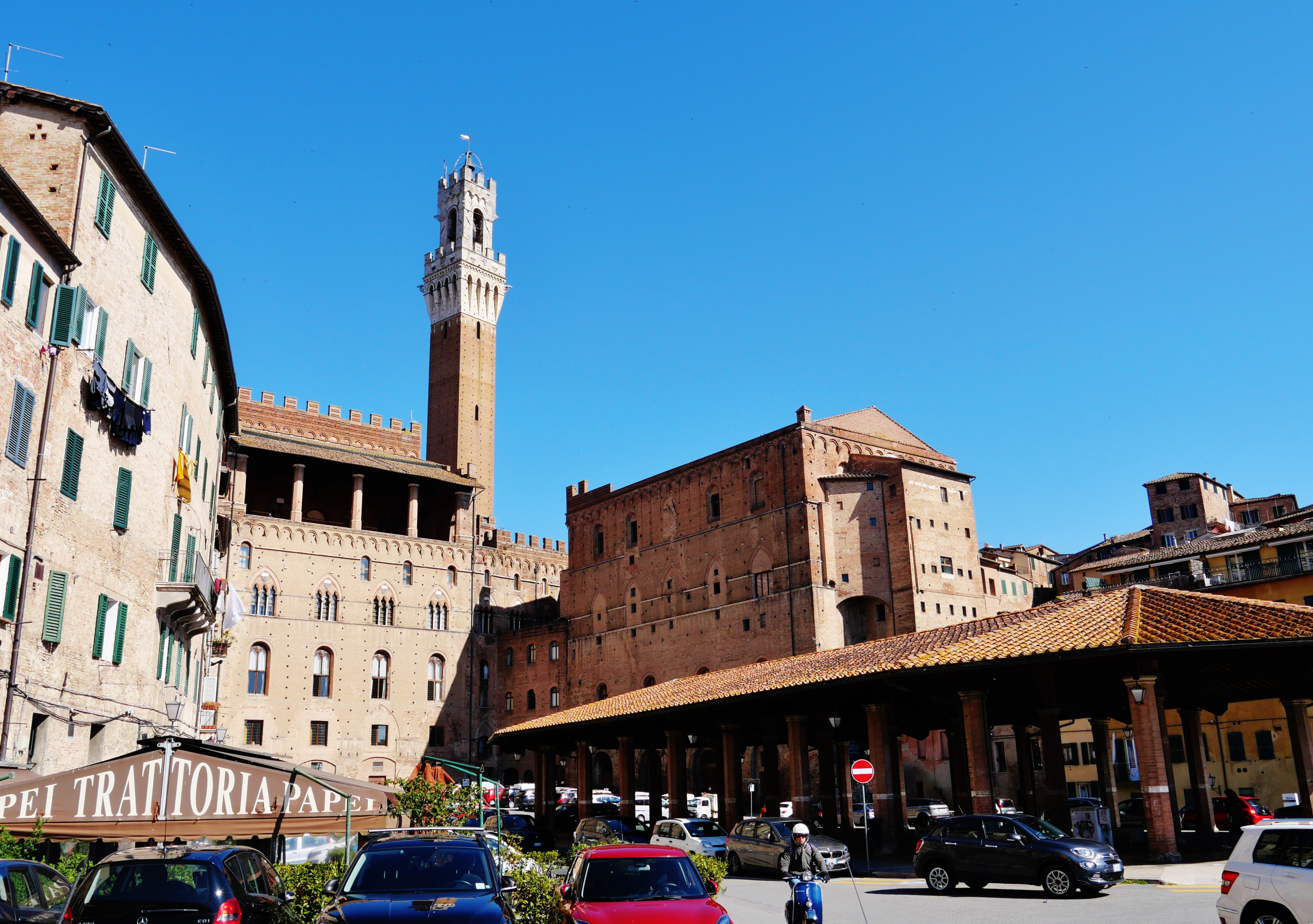

- Location within Tuscany
- Location: Siena, Tuscany, Italy
- Coordinates: 43°19′03″N 11°19′58″E

Piazza del Mercato is a square in central Siena, Region of Tuscany, Italy.

It is one of the largest urban spaces within the medieval centre, located at the rear of the Palazzo Pubblico, and historically the site of the city market. On the southern side, the square opens up with a wide terrace overlooking the valley below.

== History ==
The square, historically the site of the livestock market, extended from the back of the Palazzo Pubblico to the valley below. Starting in 1862, the municipal administration decided to renovate the area for reasons of decorum and public hygiene. Engineer Giuseppe Cantucci designed a covered market, completed in 1884, known as "Tartarugone" ("Tortoise") due to its thirty-two octagonal brick pillars and wooden roof, inspired by the medieval elements of the Palazzo Pubblico.

The square hosted the city market until 1954, when the market was moved to Viale XXV Aprile, and was subsequently renovated to take on its current appearance.
