= Ambrogio Lorenzetti =

Italian painter (1290–1348)

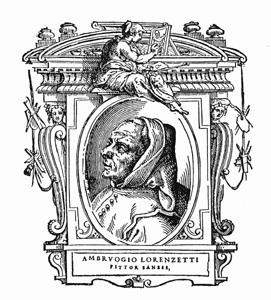
- Portrait in the Life of Artists, by Giorgio Vasari (1568)
- Born: c. 1285/1290; Siena, Republic of Siena
- Died: c.1348 (aged 57–63); Siena, Republic of Siena
- Known for: Painting, fresco
- Notable work: Allegory of good government, Allegory of bad government
- Movement: Gothic

Ambrogio Lorenzetti (Italian pronunciation: [amˈbrɔːdʒo lorenˈtsetti]; c. 1290 – after 9 August 1348) was an Italian painter of the Sienese school. He was active from approximately 1317 to 1348. He painted The Allegory of Good and Bad Government in the Sala dei Nove (Salon of Nine or Council Room) in the Palazzo Pubblico at Siena. His elder brother was the painter Pietro Lorenzetti.

== Biography ==
Lorenzetti was highly influenced by both Italo-Byzantine art and classical art forms, and used these to create a unique and individualistic style of painting. His work was exceptionally original. Individuality at this time was unusual due to the influence of patronage on art. Because paintings were often commissioned, individualism in art was infrequently seen. It is known that Lorenzetti engaged in artistic pursuits that often were thought to have their origins later during the Renaissance, such as experimenting with perspective and physiognomy, and studying classical antiquity. His body of work clearly shows the innovativeness that subsequent artists chose to emulate.

His work, although more naturalistic, shows the influence of Simone Martini. The earliest dated work of Lorenzetti is a Madonna and Child (1319, Museo Diocesano, San Casciano). His presence in Florence was documented up until 1321 and he would return there after spending a number of years again in his native city, Siena.

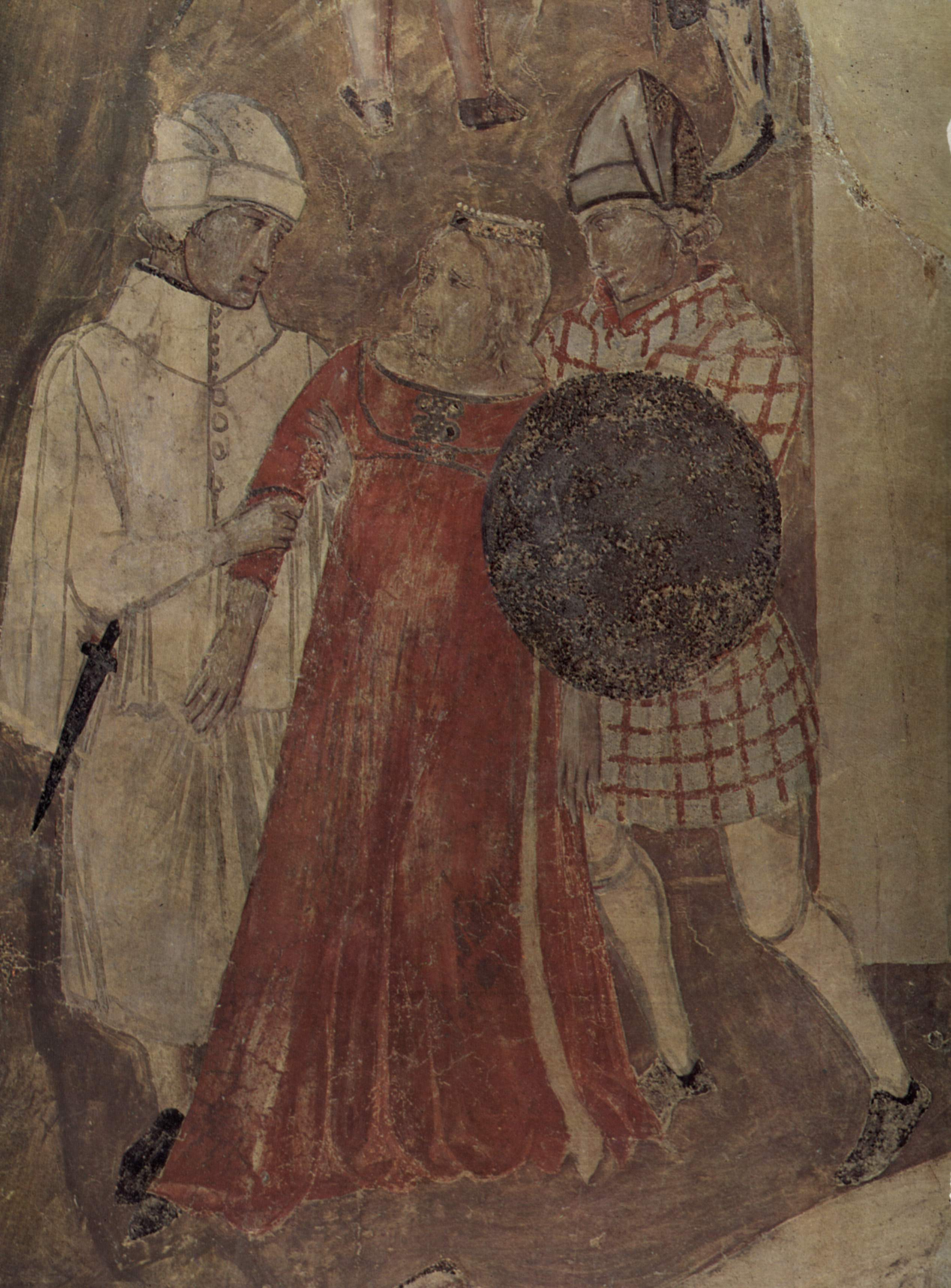
Allegory of bad government, detail showing two soldiers robbing a woman

He painted The Allegory of Good and Bad Government. These frescoes on the walls of the Room of the Nine (Sala dei Nove) or Room of Peace (Sala della Pace) in the Palazzo Pubblico in Siena are one of the masterworks of early Renaissance secular painting. The "Nine" was the oligarchal assembly of guild and monetary interests that governed the republic. Three walls are painted with frescoes consisting of a large assembly of allegorical figures of virtues in the Allegory of Good Government. In these facing panels, Ambrogio weaves panoramic visions of Effects of Good Government on Town and Country, and Allegory of Bad Government and its Effects on Town and Country (also called "Ill-governed Town and Country"). The better preserved "well-governed town and country" is an unrivaled pictorial encyclopedia of incidents in a peaceful medieval "borgo" and countryside. The landscape Lorenzetti depicted in this series is the first to appear as a subject in Western art following the Classical period.

The first evidence of the existence of the hourglass also may be found in one of these frescoes, Allegory of Bad Government and Its Effects on Town and Country.

Both he and his brother are believed to have died of bubonic plague in 1348. His will is dated as the ninth of August 1348. Giorgio Vasari includes a biography of Lorenzetti in his Lives of the Most Excellent Painters, Sculptors, and Architects.

== Selected works ==
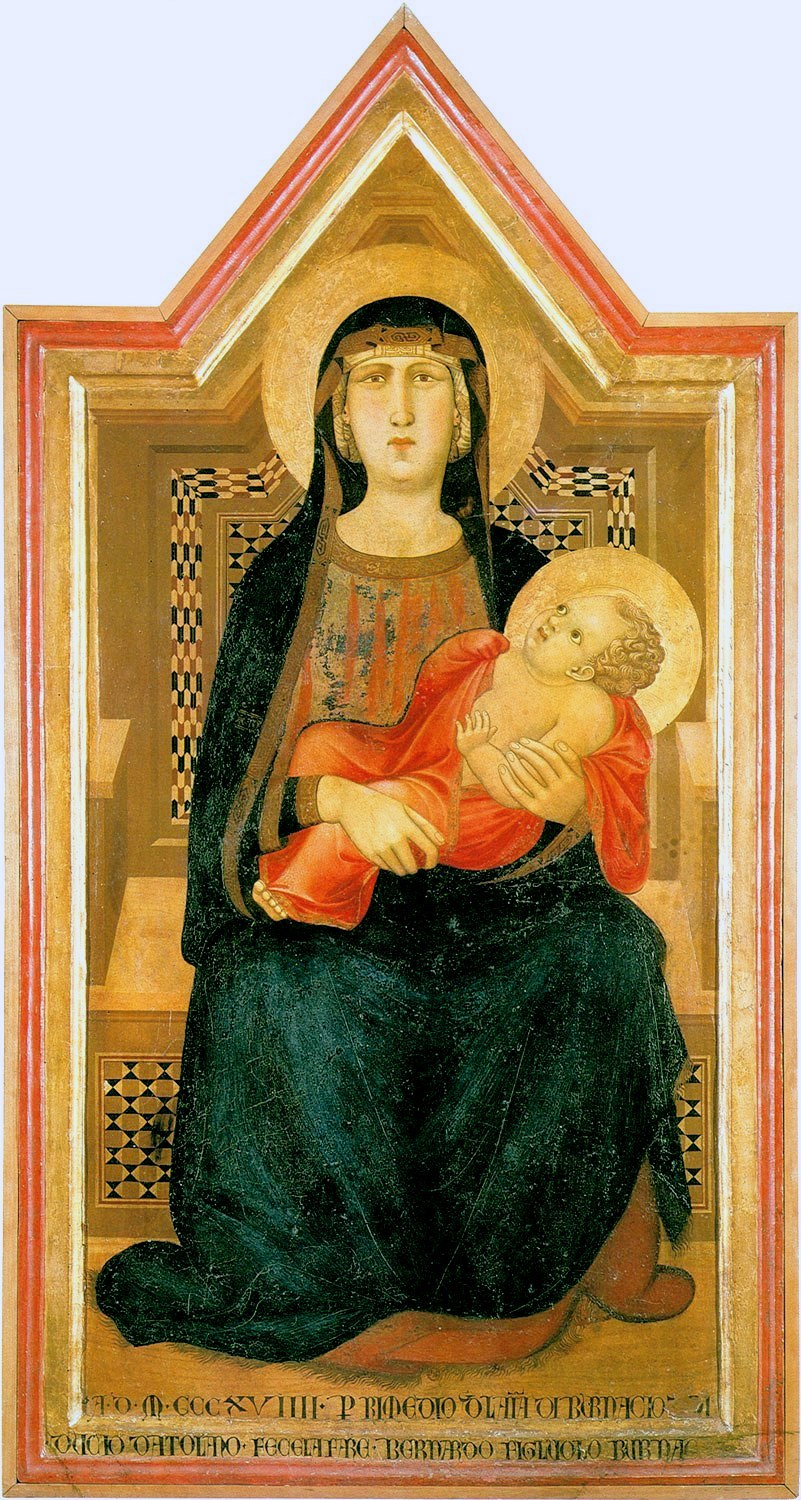
Madonna and Child, 1319

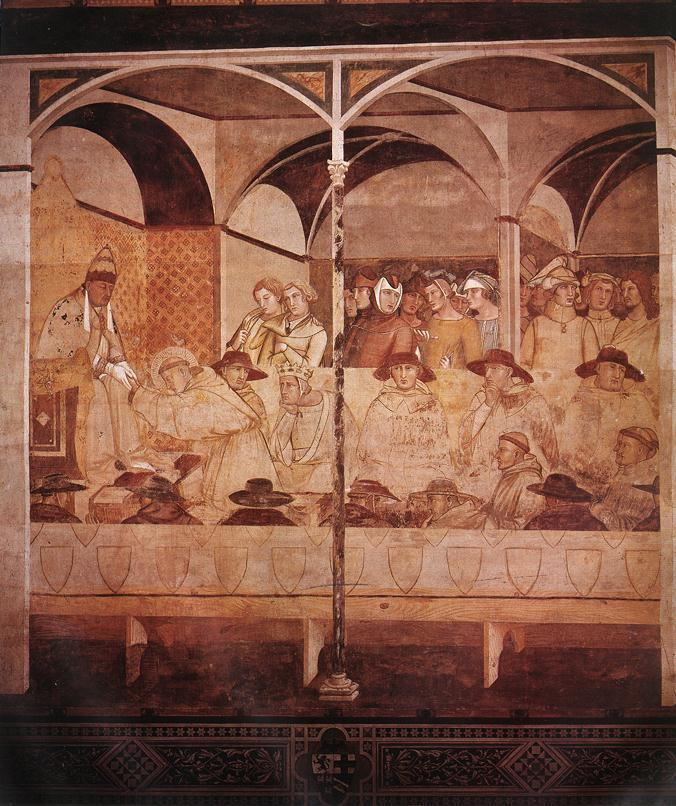
Investiture of Saint Louis of Toulouse, 1329

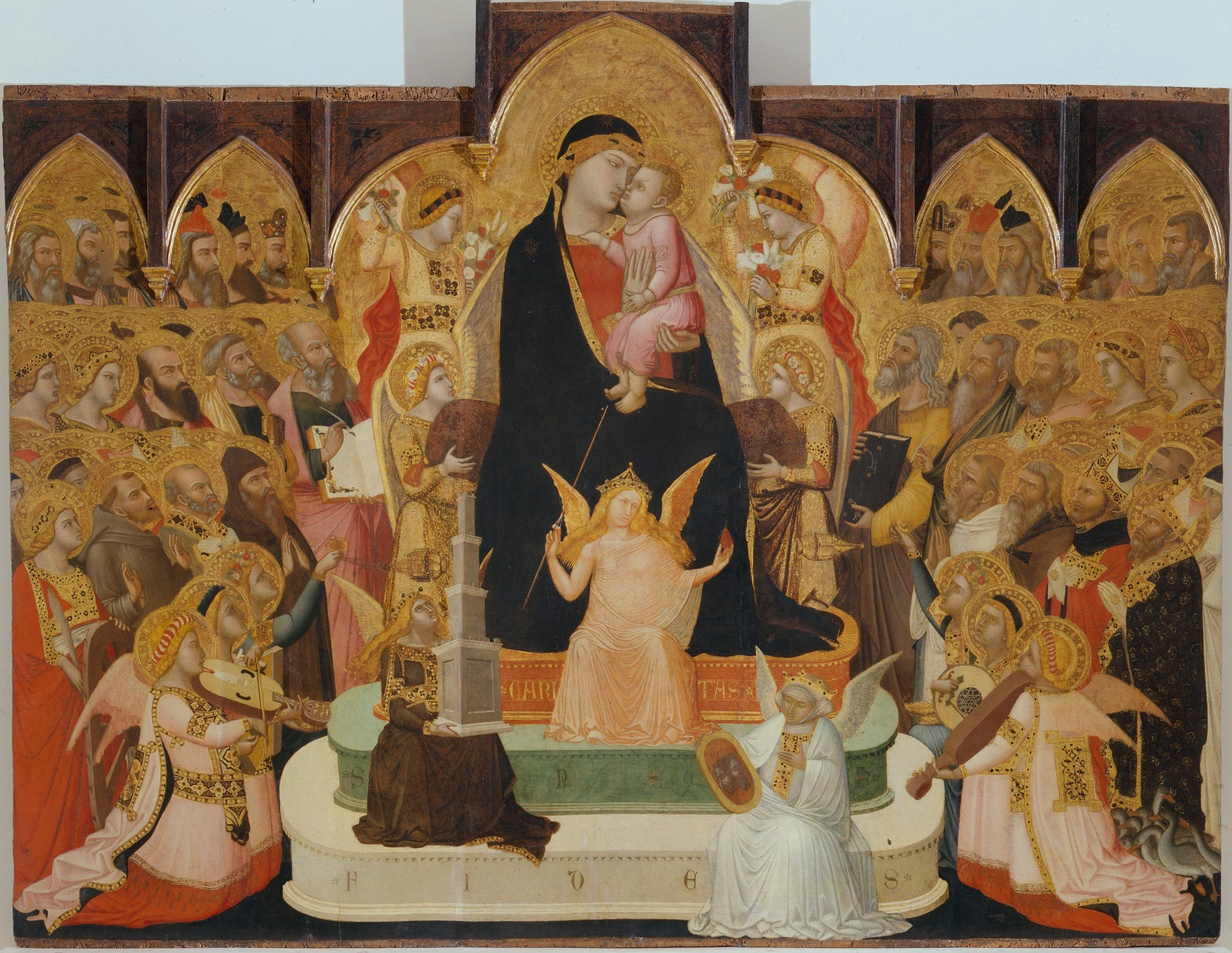
Maestà, 1335

=== Madonna and Child, 1319 ===
In Madonna and Child, there is a clear debt to Byzantine art. The image of the Madonna is noted for its frontality that is a typical characteristic of Byzantine art. The Madonna faces the viewer, as the Child gazes up at her. Although not so emotionally intense as subsequent Madonnas, in Lorenzetti's Madonna and Child, the Virgin Mary belies a subtle level of emotion as she confronts the viewer. This difference could be attributed to the patron's stylistic wishes for Madonna and Child, or could indicate Lorenzetti's evolution of style. Even in this early work, there is evidence of Lorenzetti's talent for conveying the monumentality of figures, without the application of chiaroscuro. Chiaroscuro was often used to subtle effect in Byzantine art to depict spatial depth. Ambrogio instead used color and patterns to move the figures forward, as seen in Madonna and Child.

=== Investiture of Saint Louis of Toulouse, 1329 ===
In this fresco, St. Louis is being greeted by Pope Boniface VIII as he is granted the title of Bishop of Toulouse. It was one in a series of frescoes painted with his brother, Pietro Lorenzetti, for Saint Francis of Assisi. This fresco is particularly well known for its realistic sense of depth within an architectural environment that is attributed to Ambrogio, due to Lorenzetti's compellingly rendered, three-dimensional space. Moreover, his figures are positioned in a very natural and familiar manner, introducing an awareness of naturalism in art. Lorenzetti's command of spatial perspective is thought to prefigure the Italian Renaissance. This fresco also shows his talent for depicting emotion, as we see on King Charles II's face during the king's witness to his son's rejection of material goods and power. Such attention to detail possibly indicates an intellectual curiosity. Giorgio Vasari, in Lives of the Most Excellent, Painters, Sculptors and Architects wrote of Lorenzetti's intellectual abilities, saying that his manners were "more those of a gentleman and philosopher than those of an artist".

=== Maestà, 1335 ===
In his Maestà, completed in 1335, his use of allegory prefigures Effects of Bad Government in the City. Allegorical elements reference Dante, indicating an interest in literature. Additionally, this might point to the beginnings of vernacularization of literature at this time, a precursor to humanist ideas. In Maestà, Lorenzetti followed the artistic tradition set by other Sienese painters such as Simone Martini, but adds an intense maternal bonding scene to Maestà, which was unusual in contemporary Sienese art. In the painting, the Virgin gazes at her child with intense emotion as he grasps her dress, returning her gaze. By personalizing the Virgin Mary in this way, Lorenzetti has made her seem more human, thus creating a profound psychological effect on the viewer. This highlights the increasing secularity in Sienese art at this time, of which Lorenzetti was a leading proponent, through the uniqueness of his painting style. The crowd of saints depicted with the Virgin is a Byzantine artistic tradition, used to indicate an assemblage of witnesses. As such, Lorenzetti's art could be seen as a transition between Byzantine and Renaissance styles of art. Lorenzetti's interest in classical antiquity may be seen in Maestà, particularly in the depiction of Charity. In his memoirs, I Commentarii, the sculptor Lorenzo Ghiberti mentions Lorenzetti's interest in an antique statue uncovered during an excavation in Siena at the time that is attributed to the Greek sculptor, Lysippus.

=== Allegory of Good and Bad Government, 1338-1339 ===
The Allegory of Good and Bad Government, known in Italian as Allegoria ed effetti del Buono e del cattivo governo, is a series of three fresco panels painted by Lorenzetti between February 1338 and May 1339. The work is located in the Palazzo Pubblico of Siena, specifically in the Sala dei Nove, which translates to the 'salon of the nine'. This room served as the council hall for the nine executive magistrates of the Republic of Siena.

=== Annunciation, 1344 ===
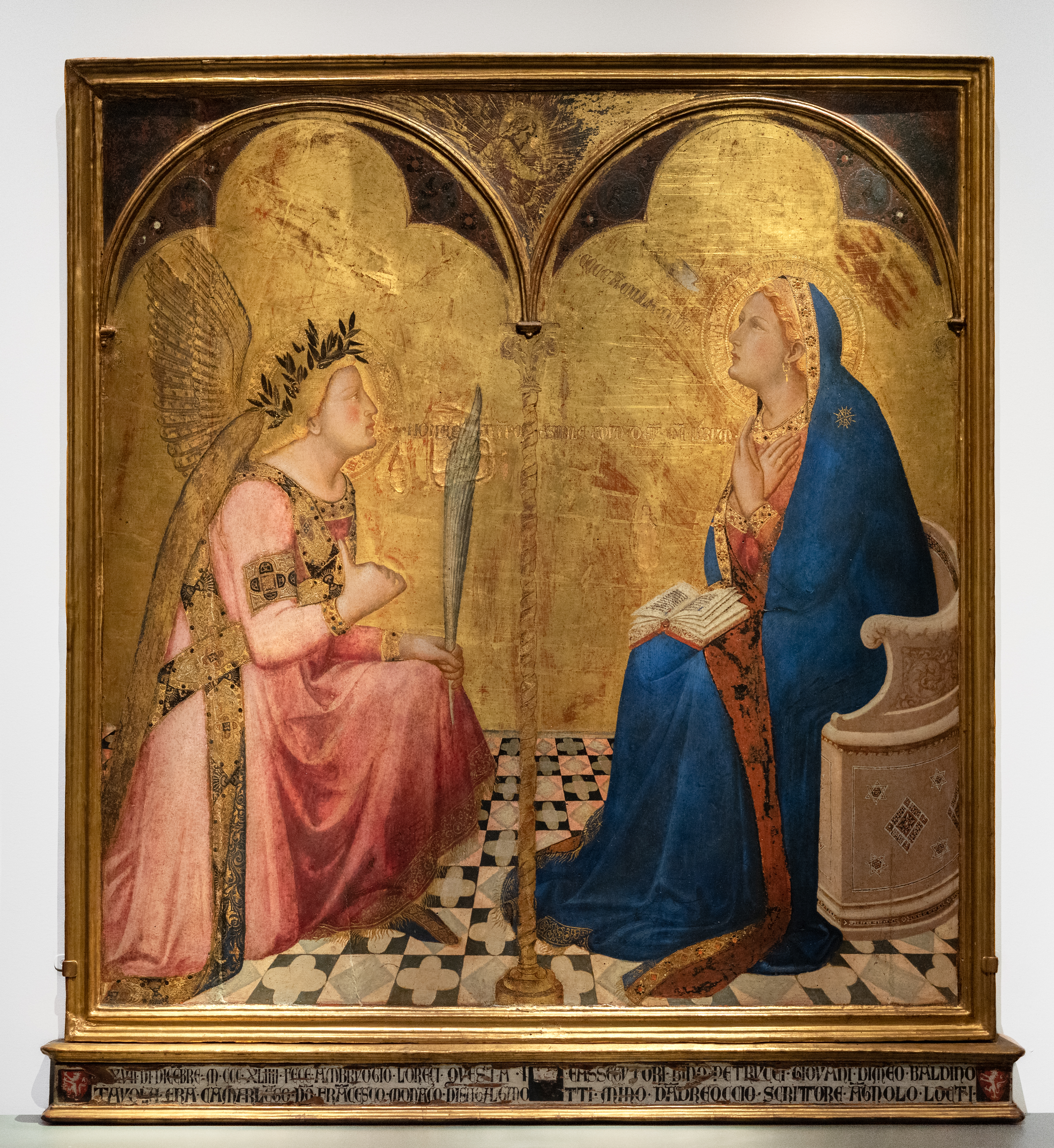
Annunciation, 1344

Lorenzetti's final work, telling the story of the Virgin Mary receiving the news from the Angel about the coming of baby Jesus, contains one of the first uses of clear linear perspective. Although it is not perfect, and the gold ground that is traditional for the time, renders a flat feeling, the diagonals created on the floor do create depth.
