= Spinello Aretino =

Italian painter (c.1350–c.1410)

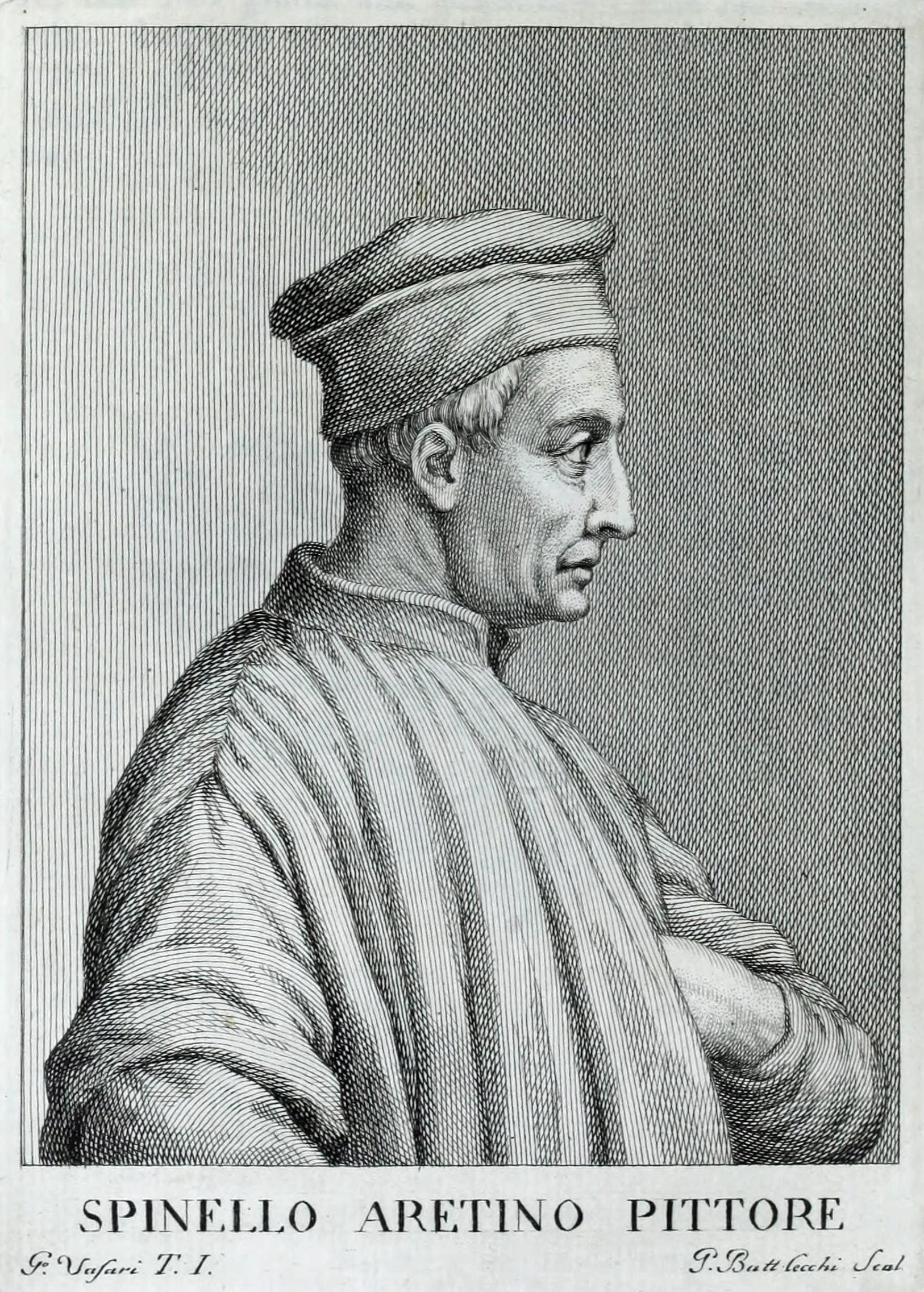
Spinello Aretino

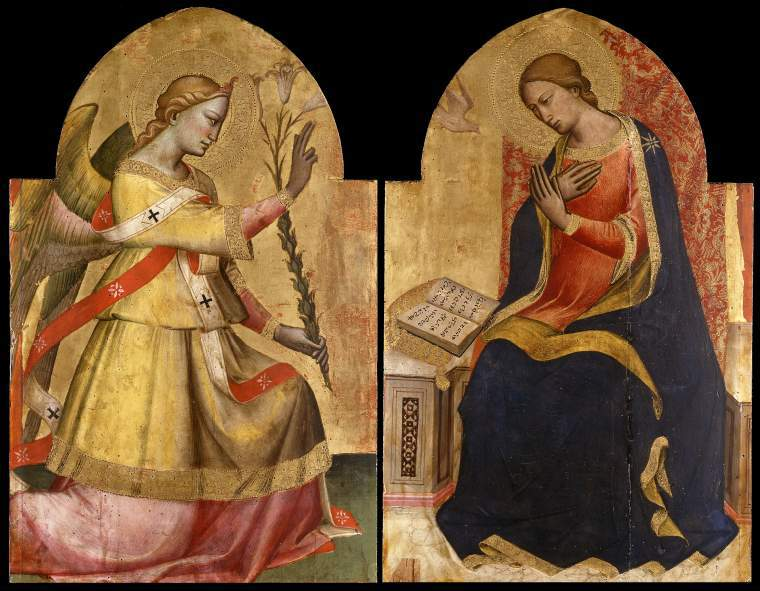
Annunciation

Spinello Aretino (c. 1350 – c. 1410) was an Italian painter from Arezzo, who was active in Tuscany at the end of the 14th and the first decade of the 15th century. His style influenced the development of late 14th- and early 15th-century painting in Tuscany.

== Life ==
Spinello Aretino was the son of a Florentine named Luca Spinelli. His family was active in the goldsmith trade and had taken refuge in Arezzo in 1310 when the rest of the Ghibelline party was exiled from Florence. They belonged to the same fraction as Dante. His actual name was Spinello Di Luca Spinelli, but he was called 'Aretino' which means 'from Arezzo'.

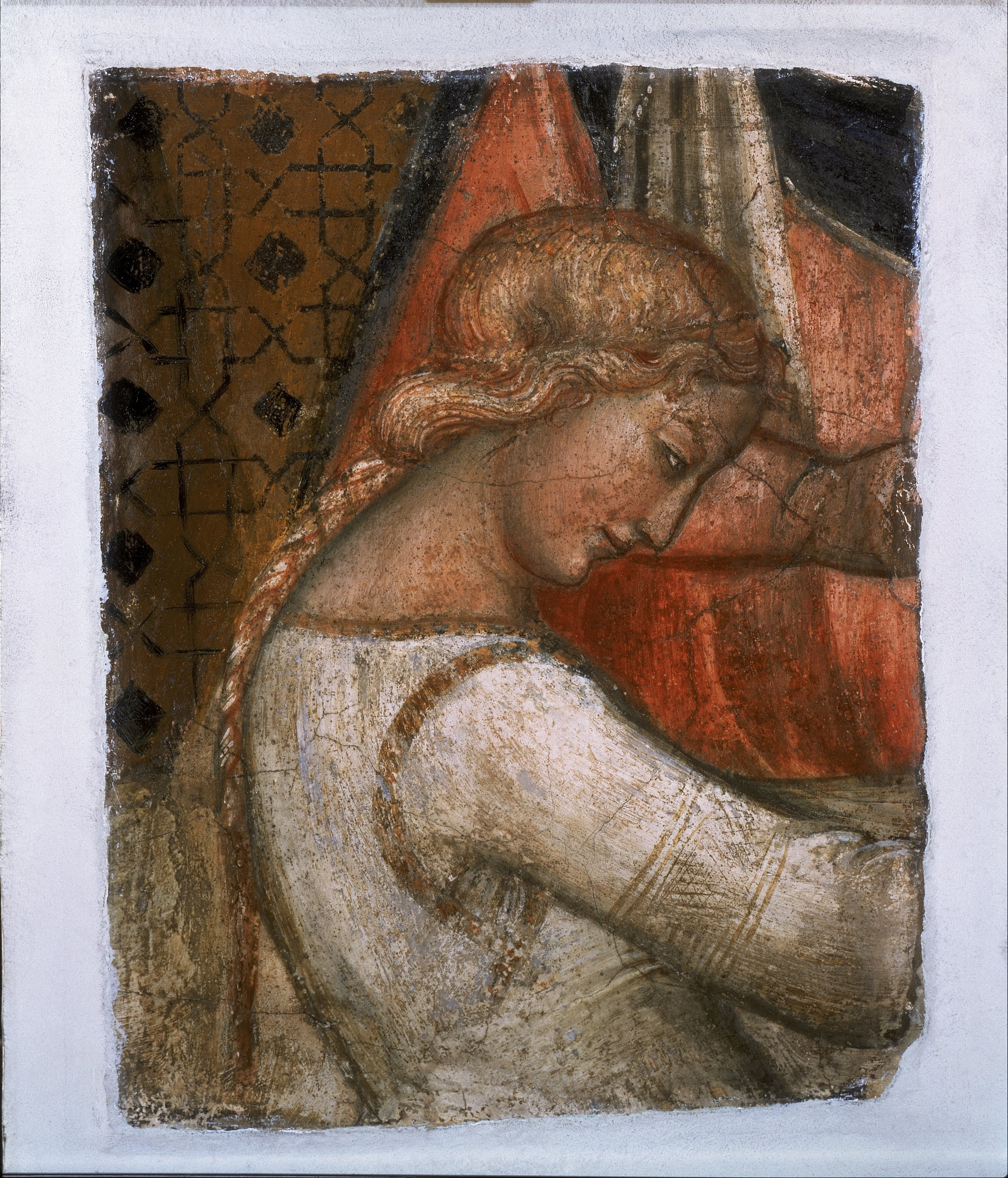
Salome

In the past it was believed that Spinello was a pupil of Jacopo del Casentino, a follower of Giotto. However, this is no longer accepted by art historians. Spinello's style was a sort of link between the school of Giotto and that of Siena. In the early part of his life he worked in Florence as an assistant to his master Jacopo while painting frescoes in the church of the Carmine and in Santa Maria Novella. Between 1360 and 1384 he was occupied in painting many frescoes in and near Arezzo, almost all of which have now perished.

After the sack of Arezzo in 1384 Spinello returned to Florence, and in 1387–1388 with some assistants covered the walls and vault of the sacristy of San Miniato of Florence with a series of frescoes, the chief of which represent scenes from the life of Saint Benedict. These still exist, though in a sadly restored condition; they are very Giotto-like in composition, but have some of the Siena decorative brilliance of color.

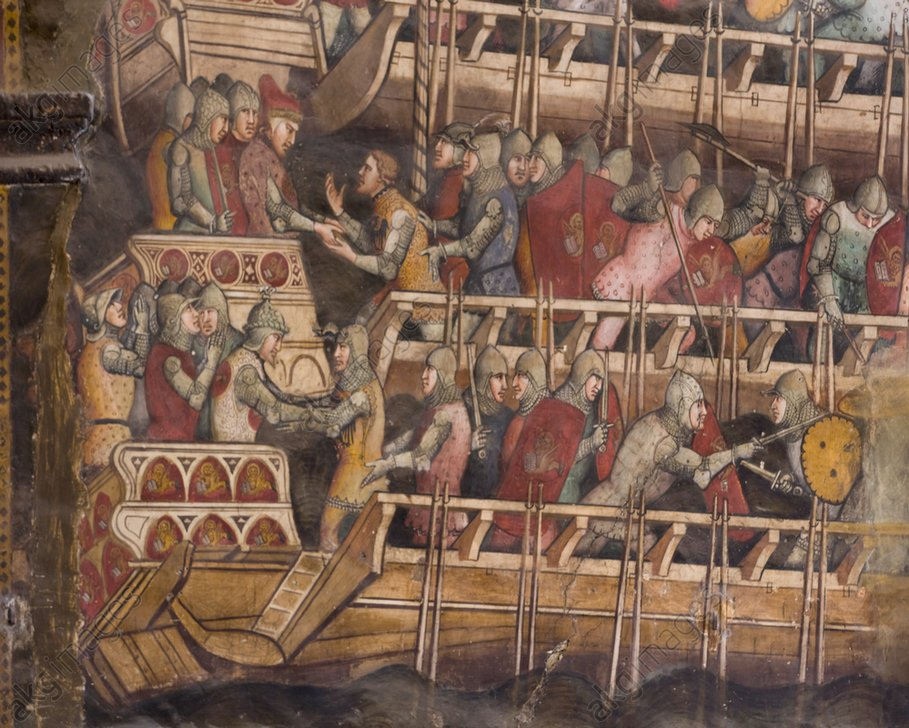
Battle of Punta San Salvatore

In 1391/92 Spinello was painting six frescoes, which still remain on the south wall of the Pisan Campo Santo, representing miracles of St. Potitus and St. Ephesus. For these he received 270 gold florins. Among his later works the chief are the very fine series of frescoes painted in 1407–1408 on the walls and vault of a chapel in the municipal buildings of Siena; these also have suffered much from repainting, but still are the finest of Spinello's existing frescoes. Frescoes in Sala di Balia of the Palazzo Pubblico represent the war of Frederick Barbarossa against the Pope Alexander III. Spinello died in Arezzo about 1410.

== Work ==
Spinello's frescoes are all strong and highly decorative works, drawn with much spirit, and are very superior in style to his panel pictures, many of which appear to be mere bottega productions. The academy of Florence possesses a panel of the Madonna and Saints, which is chiefly interesting for its signature Hoc opus pinxit Spinellus Luce Aritio D.I.A. (1391). The easel pictures which are to be found in the various galleries of Europe give little or no notion of Spinello's power as a painter. One of the highlights of his late career is a cycle of frescos on the life of Pope Alexander III made for the Sala di Balia of the Palazzo Pubblico in Siena. There is an important painting by Spinello Aretino in the Cleveland Museum of Art, "Virgin and Christ Child With Angels".

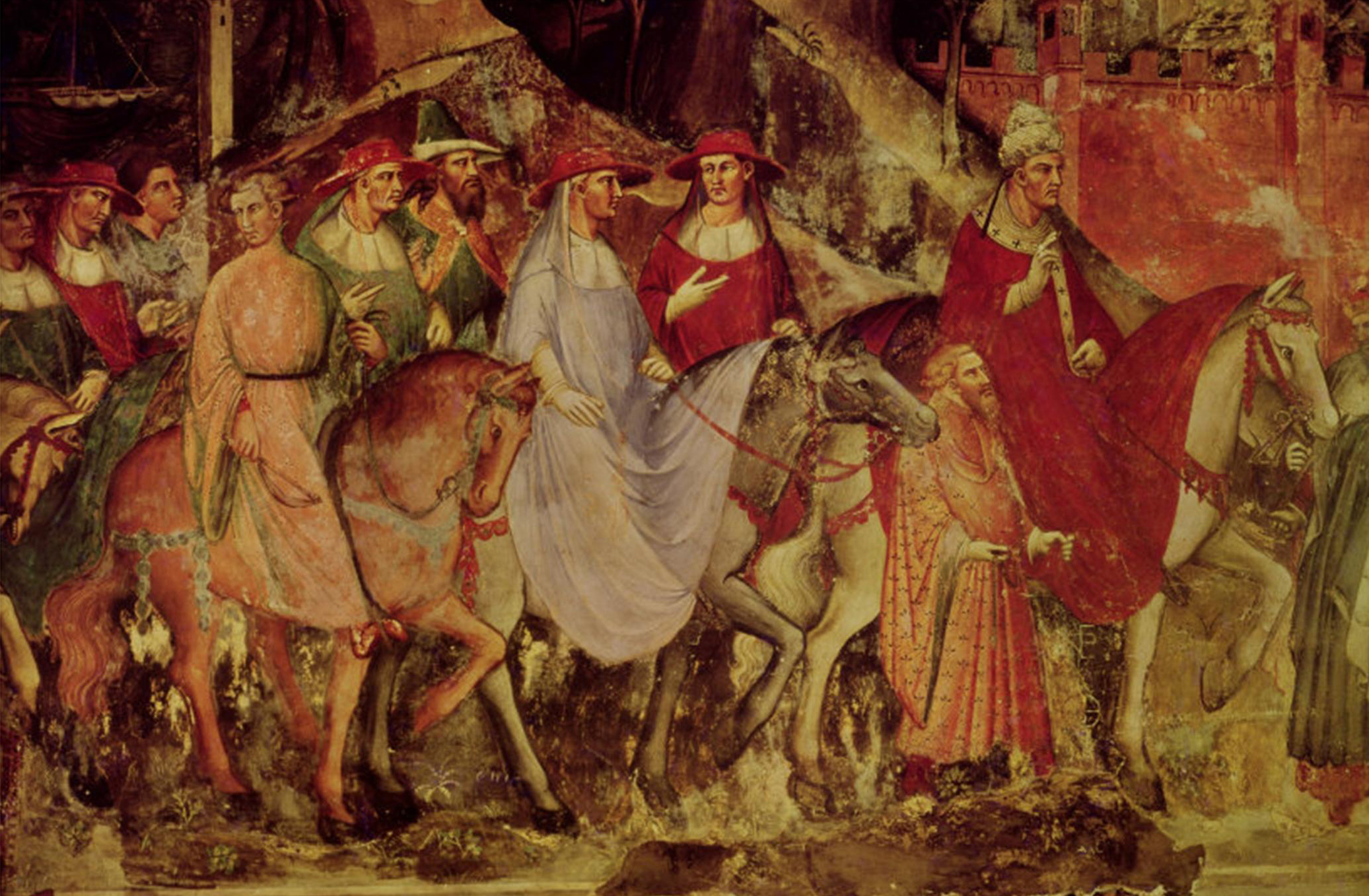
The Entrance of the Pope Alexander III and Emperor Frederick Barbarossa into Rome, 1407

There is also an important painting by Spinello Aretino in the Chicago Art Institute, "Saint Francis Before The Pope". There are also paintings by Spinello Aretino in the Hermitage Art Museum in Saint Petersburg, Russia ("Saint Benedict")("Saint Pontianus"). There is also a Late Medieval Italian Painting by Spinello Aretino in the RISD Art Museum in Providence, Rhode Island ("Saint Anthony Abbott Enthroned").
