= The Allegory of Good and Bad Government =

Painting by Ambrogio Lorenzetti

- Allegoria ed effetti del Buono e del Cattivo Governo (Italian)
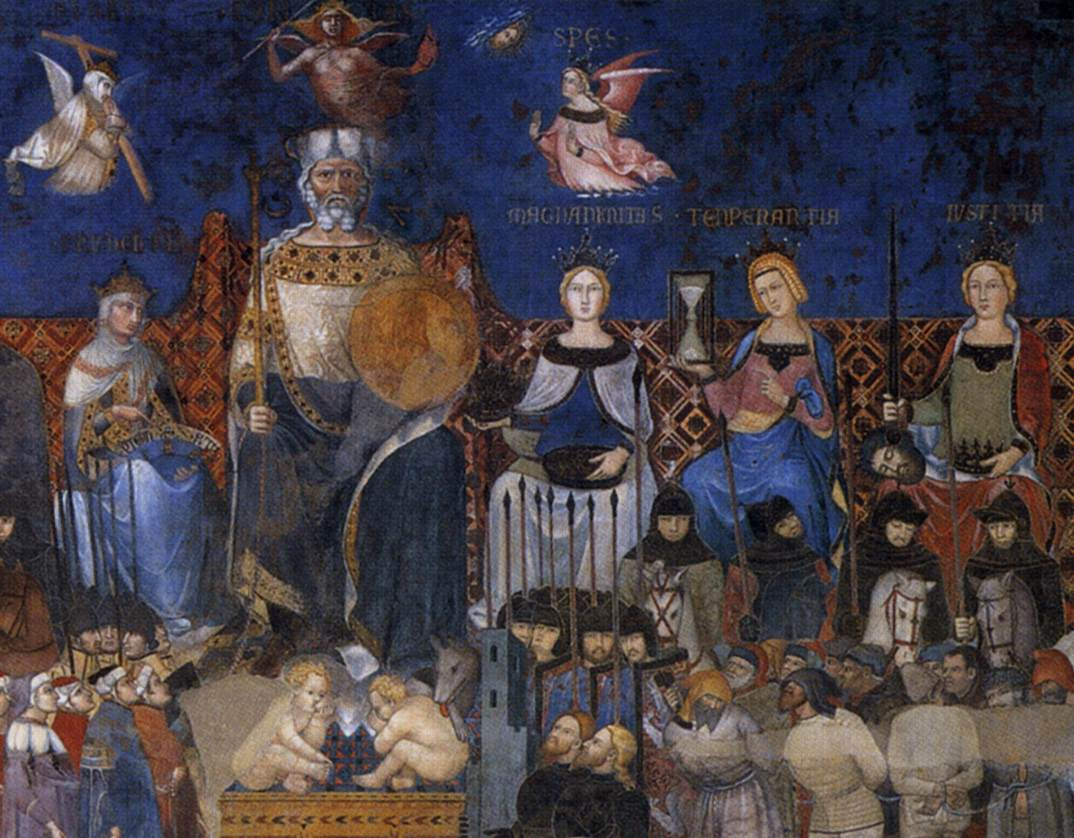
- Detail of Allegory of Good Government
- Artist: Ambrogio Lorenzetti
- Year: 1338
- Completion date: 1339
- Medium: Fresco
- Movement: Gothic art, Sienese School
- Subject: Allegorical depictions of good and bad government
- Dimensions: 7.7 x 14.4m (room)
- Location: Palazzo Pubblico, Siena
- Owner: Fondazione Musei Senesi

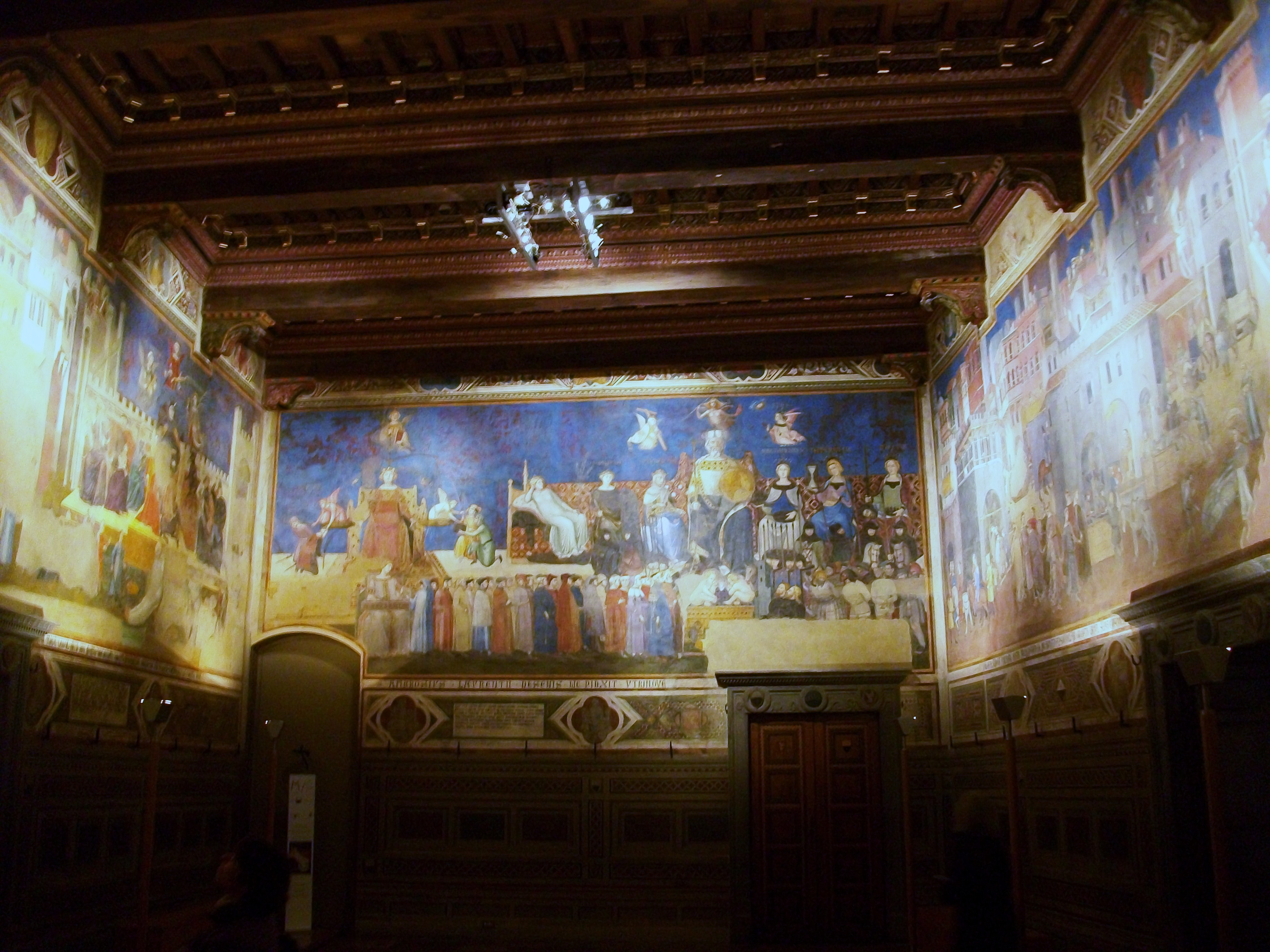
The Bad Government on the left and The Good Government in the center

The Allegory of Good and Bad Government, known in Italian as Allegoria ed effetti del Buono e del cattivo governo, is a series of three fresco panels painted by Ambrogio Lorenzetti between February 1338 and May 1339. The work is located in the Palazzo Pubblico of Siena, specifically in the Sala dei Nove, which translates to the 'salon of the nine'. This room served as the council hall for the nine executive magistrates of the Republic of Siena.

An interpretation of the paintings suggests they were "designed to remind the Nine [magistrates] of just how much was at stake as they made their decisions". Considered Lorenzetti's "undisputed masterpiece", the series consists of six different scenes. It is noted that the titles assigned to these scenes are all modern conveniences. These scenes are known as the Allegory of Good Government, the Allegory of Bad Government, the Effects of Bad Government in the City, the Effects of Bad Government in the Country, the Effects of Good Government in the City, and the Effects of Good Government in the Country.

== Historical context ==
The Allegory and Effects of Good and Bad Government series was commissioned by the "Council of Nine", a civic group that constituted the city council. Unlike most art of the period, the subject matter is civic rather than religious. The Republic of Siena was one of the most powerful of the fourteenth-century Italian city-states. This century was a turbulent time for politics in Italian cities due to violent party struggles, the overthrow of governments, and the Black Death epidemic.

== Layout ==
The murals occupy a substantial area, covering three of the four walls within the Council Room. The southern wall remains without a mural. It contains the sole window for the room. The door used by the council for entry is located on the opposite northern wall. On the eastern wall, Lorenzetti depicted scenes of the "Effects of Good Government", while on the opposing western wall he rendered "The Allegory and Effects of Bad Government". Overlooking both of these murals on the northern wall are the personifications of the allegorical depictions of the virtues of good government.

== Allegory of Good Government ==
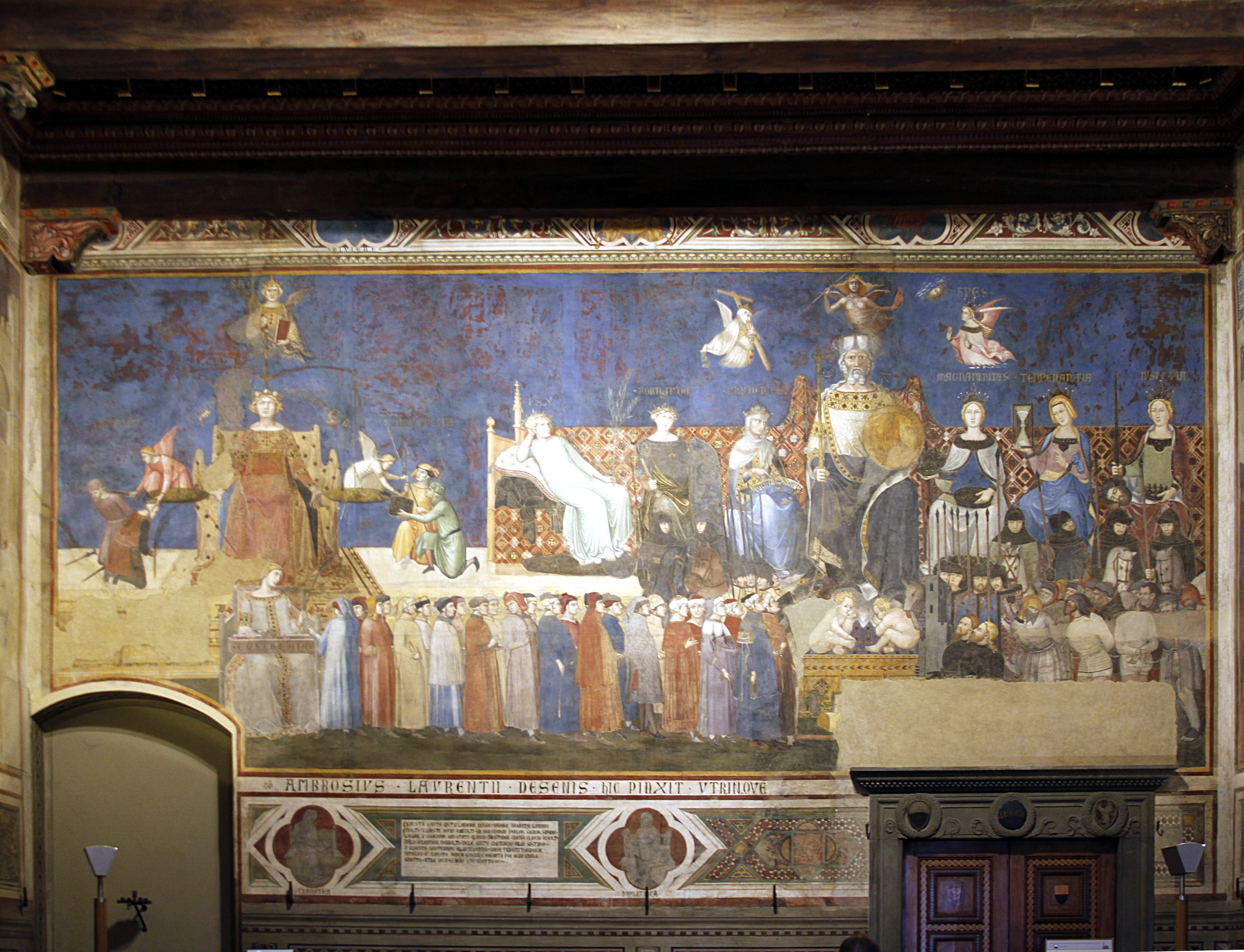
Allegory of the Good Government

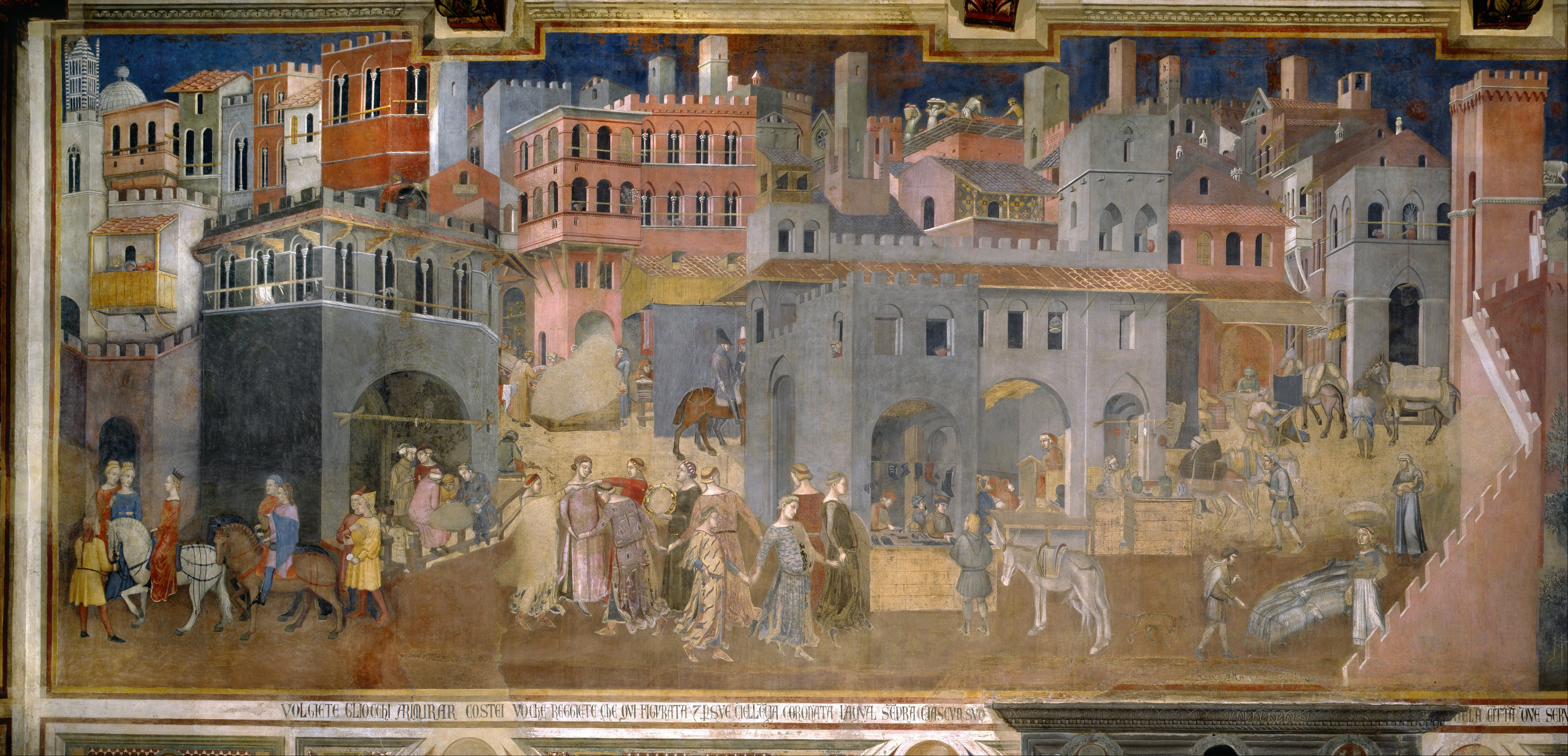
Effects of Good Government in the City

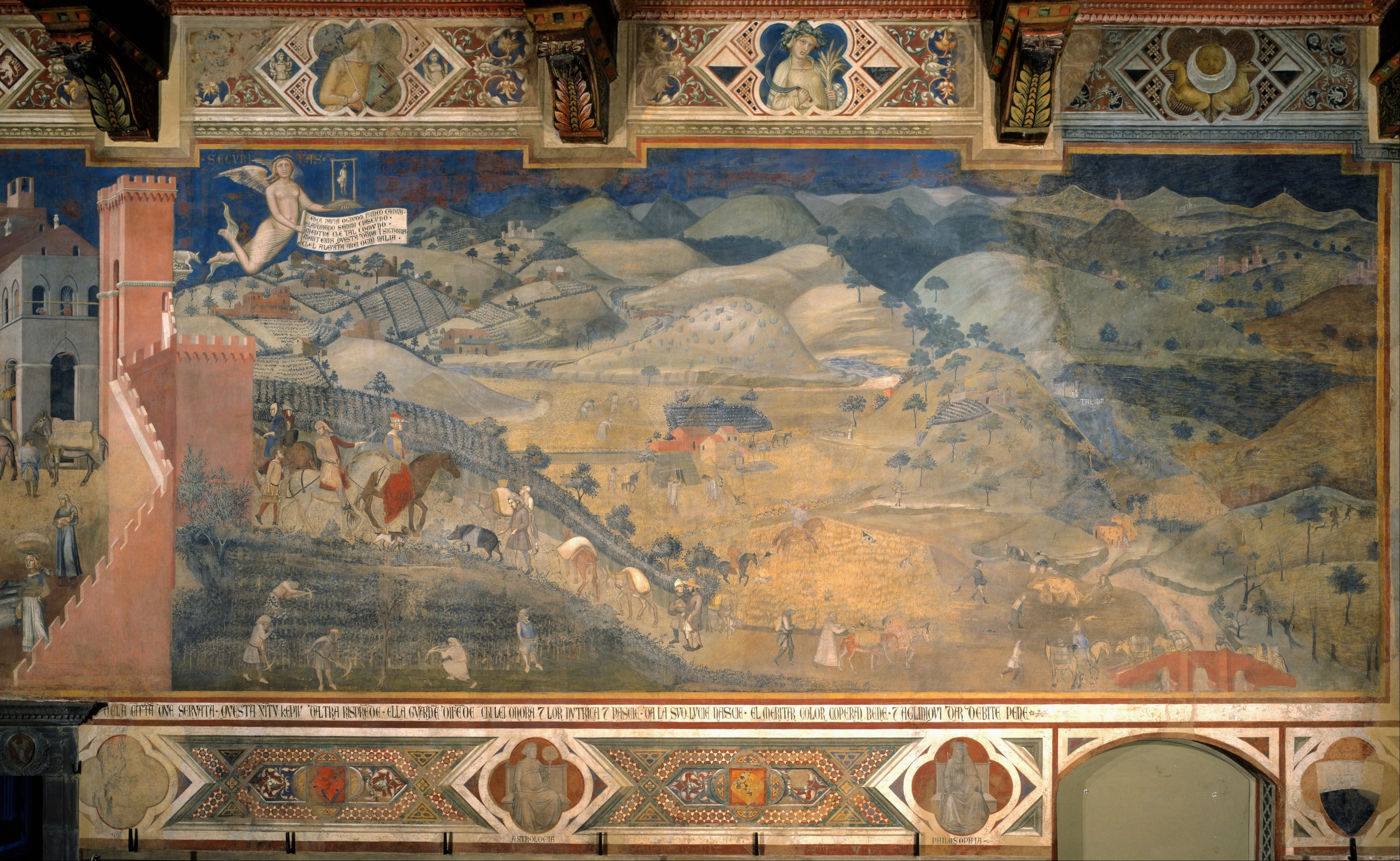
Effects of Good Government in the Country

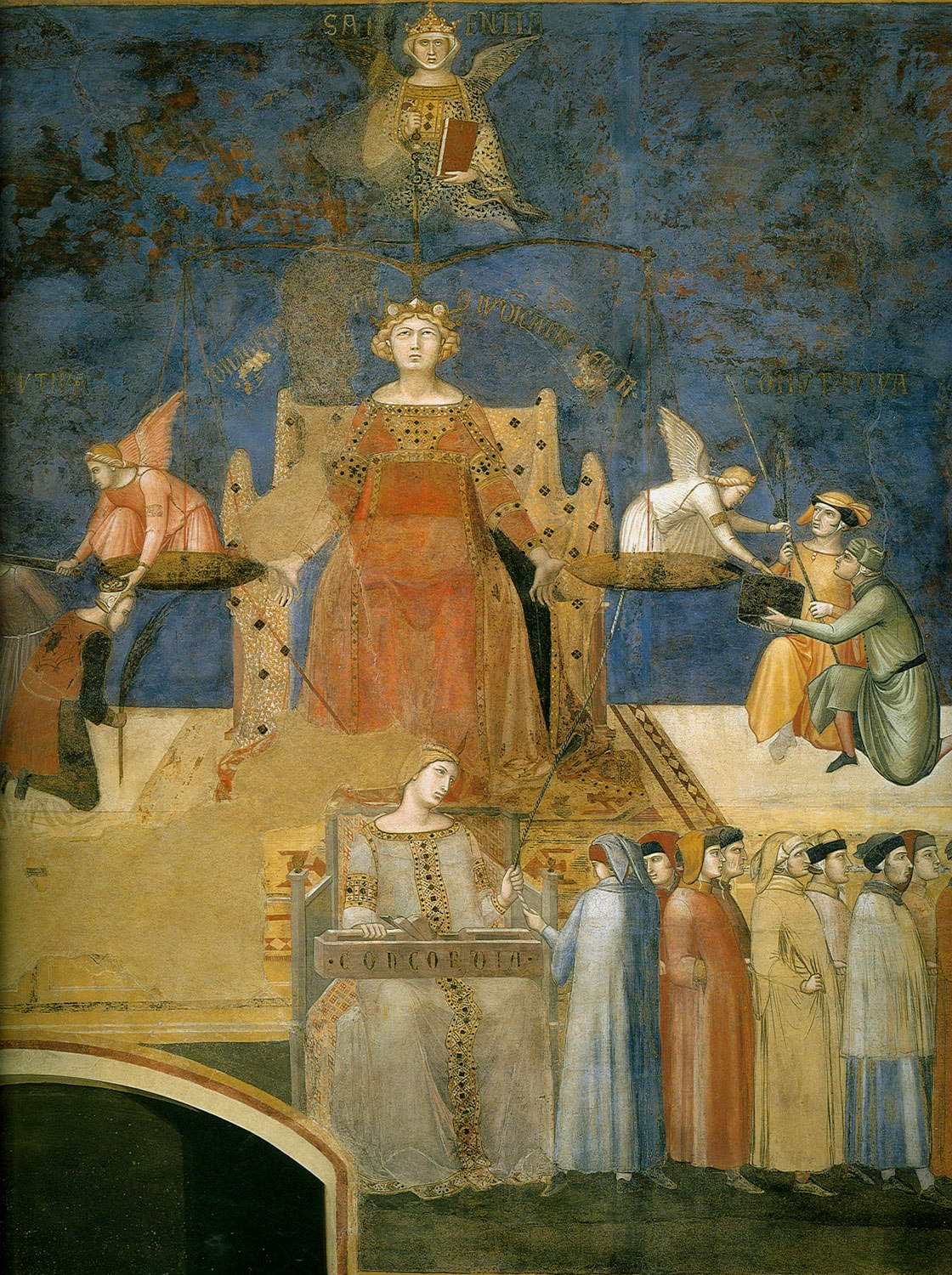
The figure of Justice in Allegory of Good Government

In the Allegory of Good Government, the composition is built up from three horizontal bands. In the foreground, the figures of contemporary Siena are represented. The citizens act as symbolic representations of the various civic officers and magistrates. They are linked by two woven cords, or concords. The concords gather from under the scales of Lady Justice. Behind them, on a stage, there are allegorical figures in two groups, representing the Good Government. The two groups are connected by the procession of the councilors. The upper band indicates the heavenly sphere with the floating bodiless ghosts of the virtues. Wisdom sits above the head of the personification of the Commune of Siena. He sits upon a throne and holds an orb and scepter, symbolizing temporal power. He is dressed in the colors of the Balzana, the black-and-white Sienese coat of arms. Around his head are the letters "C S C V", which stand for "Commune Saenorum Civitatis Virginis", which explains his identity as the embodiment of the Siena Council. That character is guided by the women representing the virtues of Faith, Hope, and Charity. He confers with the proper Virtues necessary for a proper and just ruler.

The virtues of Good Government are represented by six crowned, stately female figures: Peace, Fortitude, and Prudence on the left, and Magnanimity, Temperance, and Justice on the right. On the far left of the fresco, the figure of Justice is repeated, as she is balancing the scales held by Wisdom. The figures are naturalistic, and the figures of the women represented the ideal of female beauty in Siena.

At the feet of the ruler, two children are depicted playing. They could be the sons of Remus, Ascius and Senius, who, according to Roman legend, are the founders of Siena. It alternately is believed that the two children are the older brothers, Romulus and Remus, who founded Rome. The text within the lower border of the image reads: "This holy virtue [Justice], where she rules, induces to unity the many souls [of citizens], and they, gathered together for such a purpose, make the Common Good [ben comune] their Lord; and he, in order to govern his state, chooses never to turn his eyes from the resplendent faces of the Virtues who sit around him. Therefore to him in triumph are offered taxes, tributes, and lordship of towns; therefore, without war, every civic result duly follows—useful, necessary, and pleasurable". Below the fresco is Lorenzetti's signature: Ambrosius Laurentii De Senis Hic Pinxit Utrinque.

=== Peaceful City ===
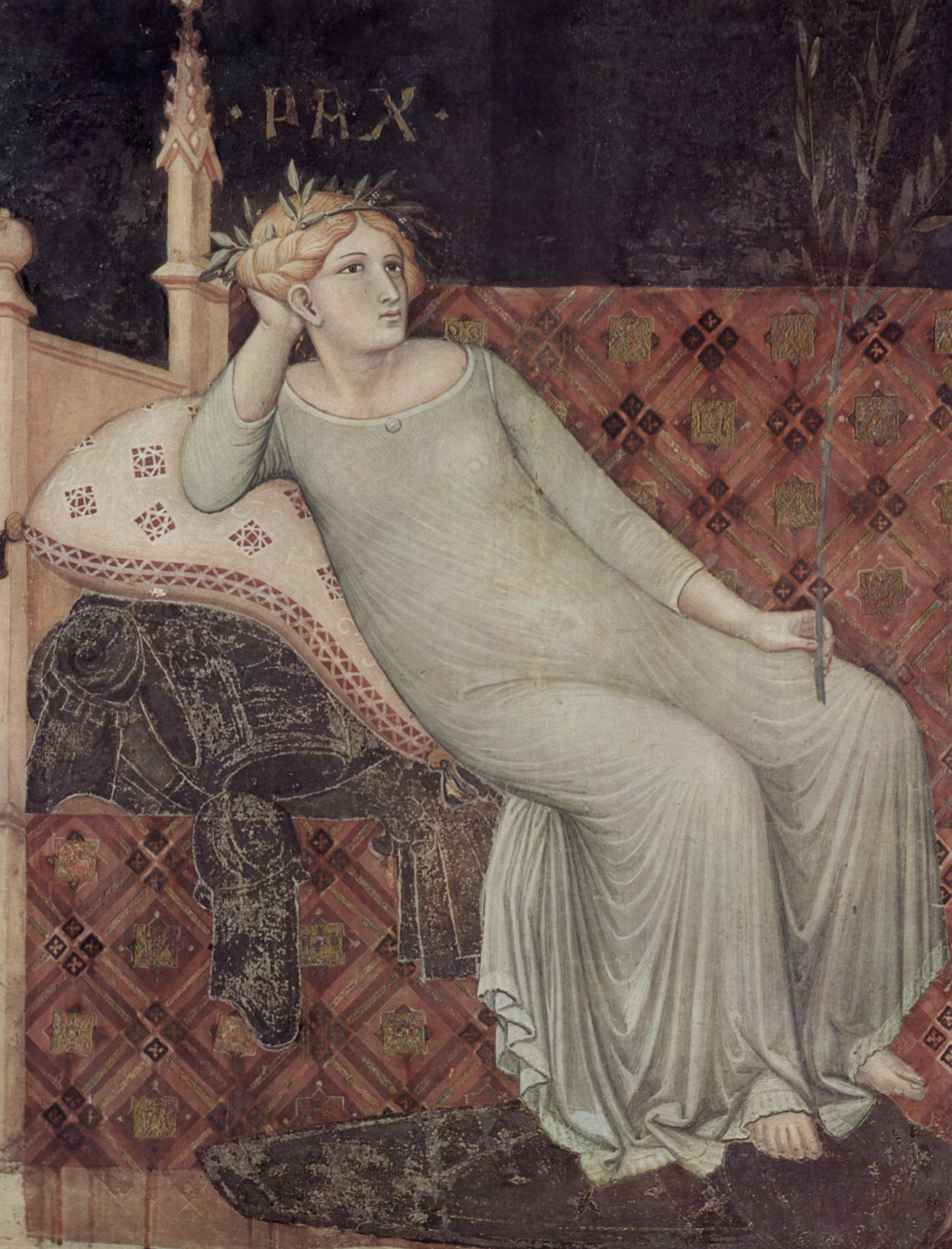
The figure of Peace in Allegory of Good Government

On the longer wall of the room in the Sala is the fresco The Effects of Good Government in the City and in the Country. Part of that fresco is Peaceful City. This panoramic fresco represents several scenes indicating the life of Siena and its environment in the fourteenth century. This painting provides the first accurate panoramic view of the city and the first landscape of countryside since antiquity; viewers may identify some characteristics of the city of Siena, as opposed to ambiguous settings found in other works of the time. The city is filled with clustered palaces, markets, towers, churches, streets, and walls. All of these aspects are reminiscent of town scenes found on ancient Roman murals. There are many shops, indicating good commerce and economic conditions. The traffic moves peacefully, guild members work at their trades, a wedding procession takes place, and maidens may be seen dancing gracefully. Dancers were common for springtime rituals; they also act as a metaphor for a peaceful commonwealth in this painting. The young women might also represent the Nine Muses of the arts and sciences from Greek mythology. This fresco reflects the belief that if government is virtuous and rules justly, the city thrives. There is text along the lower edge of the wall that reads:

"Turn your eyes to behold her, you who are governing, who is portrayed here [Justice], crowned on account of her excellence, who always renders to everyone his due. Look how many goods derive from her and how sweet and peaceful is that life of the city where this virtue is preserved that outshines any other. She guards and defends those who honor her, and nourishes and feeds them. From her light come both requiting those who do good and giving due punishment to the wicked."

=== Peaceful Country ===
The fresco then blends into Peaceful Country. The transition is made by an entourage passing through the city gate and out to the countryside beyond the city walls. The new scene shows a bird's-eye view of the Tuscan countryside, with villas, castles, plowed farmlands, and peasants and farmers leisurely going about their responsibilities. The landscape is particularized, with characteristics that indicate a specific place and environment. The winged allegorical figure of Security hovers above the landscape holding an unfurled scroll promising safety to all who live under the rule of law. Written on her scroll is the text:

"Without fear every man may travel freely and each may till and sow, so long as this commune shall maintain this lady [Justice] sovereign, for she has stripped the wicked of all power."

=== Cosmic allegories ===
In the fresco cycle, Lorenzetti expresses the idea that the cause of peace lies not only in the effects of good government, but also from the citizens acting in accordance "with the temporal and astral force that governs" them. Lorenzetti expresses this idea in part with the border along the three frescos, which display medallions featuring the personifications of the planets, as well as the seasons. Above the mural depicting The Effects of Good Government, these medallions follow the natural order of the seasons and alignment of the planets. In The Effects of Good Government, Lorenzetti shows the citizens completing the different labors for each of the months. The labors belonging to spring and summer are very clear; "fishing and tending to the vines (March), cultivation of the soil and planting (April), riding (May), ploughing and stock raising (June), cereal harvesting (July), threshing (August), and hunting (September)".

The labors of winter and fall are also found, but they do not follow the normal conventions of the time for depicting these labors. With these depictions of the labors following with the seasons and planets, Lorenzetti creates the idea that peace is in part possible due to the citizens following in accordance to the planets and seasons. It is also hypothesized that, with the depictions of citizens in different labors, Lorenzetti shows the allegorical manifestations of the children of the different planets. Upon closer analysis, it is clear that Lorenzetti depicted the children who would help ensure peace versus those who would be disruptive of it. This can be seen with the emphasis of mercantile activities that were believed to be Mercury's children. For the children of Venus, Lorenzetti chose to show a bride, weavers, and dancers, instead of depicting her more carnal children. The children of Mars, who all depend on the use of weapons, are represented by knights and guards. Saturn's children are represented by ploughmen, diggers, and threshers, and excludes his other children, such as cripples. Jupiter's children are represented as hunters. With Lorenzetti emphasizing the children who would ensure peace, he drove home the importance of following activities to foster peace and not to disrupt it. With both the depiction of the monthly labors and the children of the various planets, Lorenzetti shows the importance of performing the appropriate tasks in accordance to nature to ensure peace. This point is made stronger by the fact that half the seasons and plants are shown depicted over the scene of war, reminding the viewer the faulty error of not acting in accordance.

=== Venus and the dancers ===
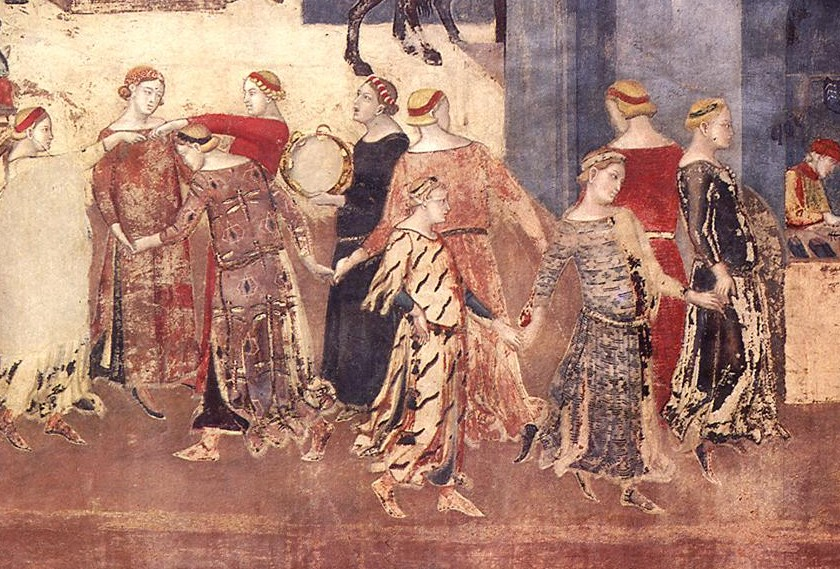
Dancers in Effects of Good Government

The ten dancers featured in the middle of The Effects of Good Government fresco are the subject of many discussions. It is believed they are the representation of Venus's children. It was believed in Lorenzetti's day that there were two manifestations of Venus. These two sides found their forms in either the legitimate planetary deity, or as the nude goddess born of the sea. When looking at the depictions of the personifications of the other planets along the fresco borders, they are seen placed in both their houses. Venus, on the other hand, is only placed in Taurus, her daytime house. With this careful choice, Lorenzetti legitimizes her side as a planetary goddess. This is further enforced with her modest dress, instead of being depicted nude. Her children, in turn, gain the representation of chastity, matrimonial love, friendship, and sociability, all aspects that flourish during daylight hours. Their dancing mimics the arm movements of Venus, and this, in combination with their larger scale, draws emphasis to the resounding message that peace in the city must be found in conjunction with the movements of the Heavens.

The arrangement of the dancers follows a continuous serpentine trajectory identifiable with both an S-shaped line, associated with Siena, and a form comparable to the lemniscate (infinity sign), symbolizing balance and renewal. The group is rendered at a larger scale than nearby figures, such as the wedding party on the left, making them visually prominent. Their appearance is also notable in light of Sienese statutes issued in 1338, which prohibited public dancing and restricted the wearing of silk. Yet, the dancers are dressed in silk garments.

=== Perspective ===
The Effects of Good Government makes use of a skewed perspective. The cityscape and the scale of the figures do not seem to follow a rational scheme. Lorenzetti has introduced a more modern application of perspective than typical among artists of his time, although his application does not appear consistent. There have been two hypotheses put forward to explain the perspective provided to the images by Lorenzetti.

One hypothesis is that the skewed perspective comes from the fact that the mural derives its perspective from a center directly in front of the figure of Tyranny on the wall opposite the fresco. The interpretation is that the depiction of good government then radiates from this center, making use of a more radial perspective.

The second and more popular hypothesis about the skewed perspective is that the perspective is derived from the gaze line of Justice. This hypothesis is supported by the fact that, whereas the other virtues sit in upright positions, looking either into space or discreetly at each other, Justice's line of gaze is directed across to the corner of the room. To further support this idea, photographs have been taken following her line of sight, and with these photographs, the buildings and figures do fall into a correct perspective. Further evidence of this hypothesis comes with an examination of the science of optics during that time in Siena. The belief was that sight was not only the act of seeing, but of understanding as well. The word for vision meant both to see and the image that the mind created. The word "light" also had dual meaning, describing "both physical and spiritual illumination". When the viewer is placed into the mindset and understanding of a Sienese citizen of the day, it strengthens the argument that the intended perspective is from that of Justice, as her gaze then creates and illuminates this peaceful scene.

=== Disagreements within location ===
The frescoes of The Effects of Good Government seem to hold one strong point of debate. Whereas some scholars strongly believe that the city depicted is supposed to represent Siena, suggested in abstraction however. Others believe that it is supposed to be a metaphor for the city. For both of these arguments, scholars take their stance from evidence they find within the fresco. Some scholars take the depiction of the bell tower and the cathedral with its dome to suggest Siena as the city represented in the fresco because they resemble the existing and distinctive Sienese buildings. Others look to the right of the countryside depiction to the small scene of the port, which includes the name "Telamon". This inscription and the depiction of the port is very small. Still, scholars look to this as proof that this scene is meant to suggest Siena to the viewers. Other scholars look to the gate, as well as other buildings, pointing out the severe differences and departures between the fresco and reality. This interpretation points to the idea that Lorenzetti meant to depict an ideal city that could be compared to, but not mistaken for Siena.

== The Effects of Bad Government ==
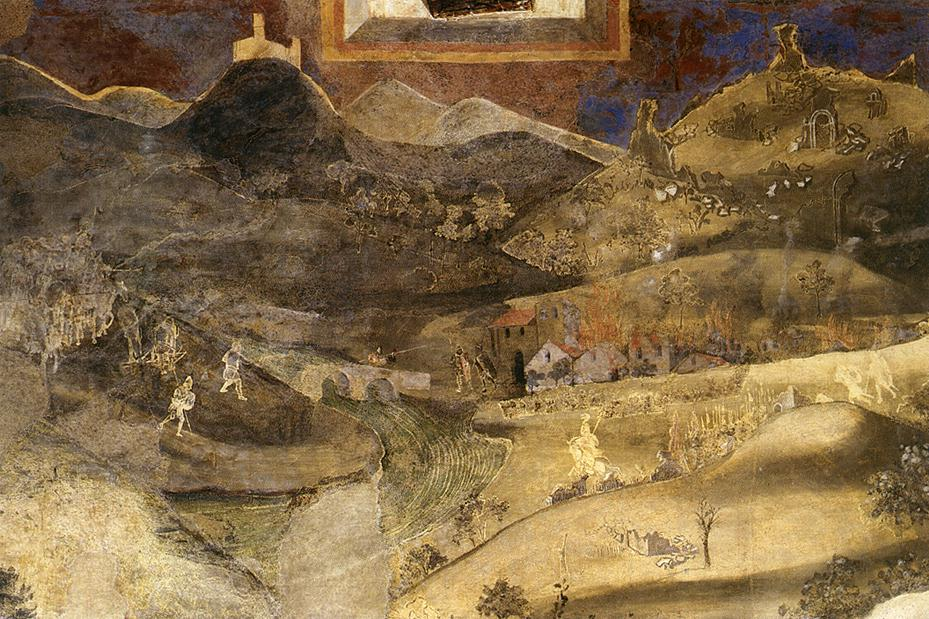
Effects of Bad Government in the Country

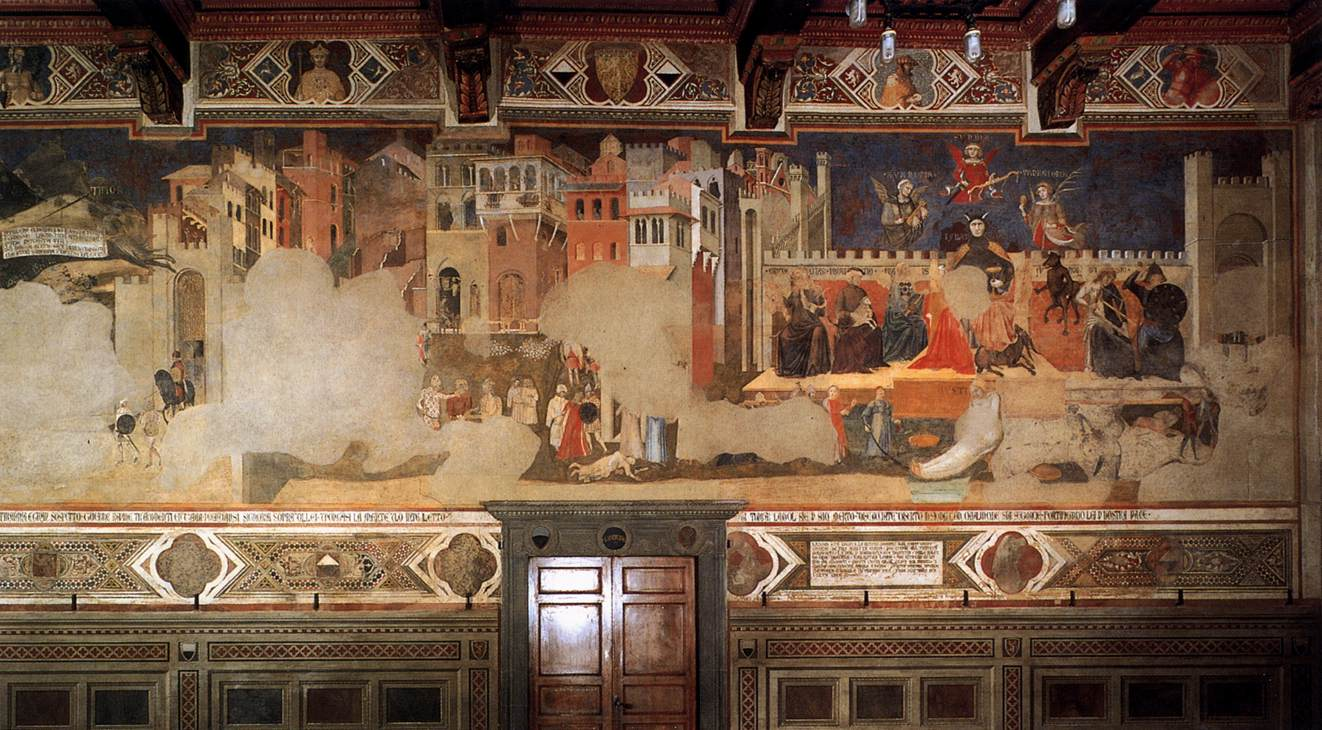
Effects of Bad Government in the City

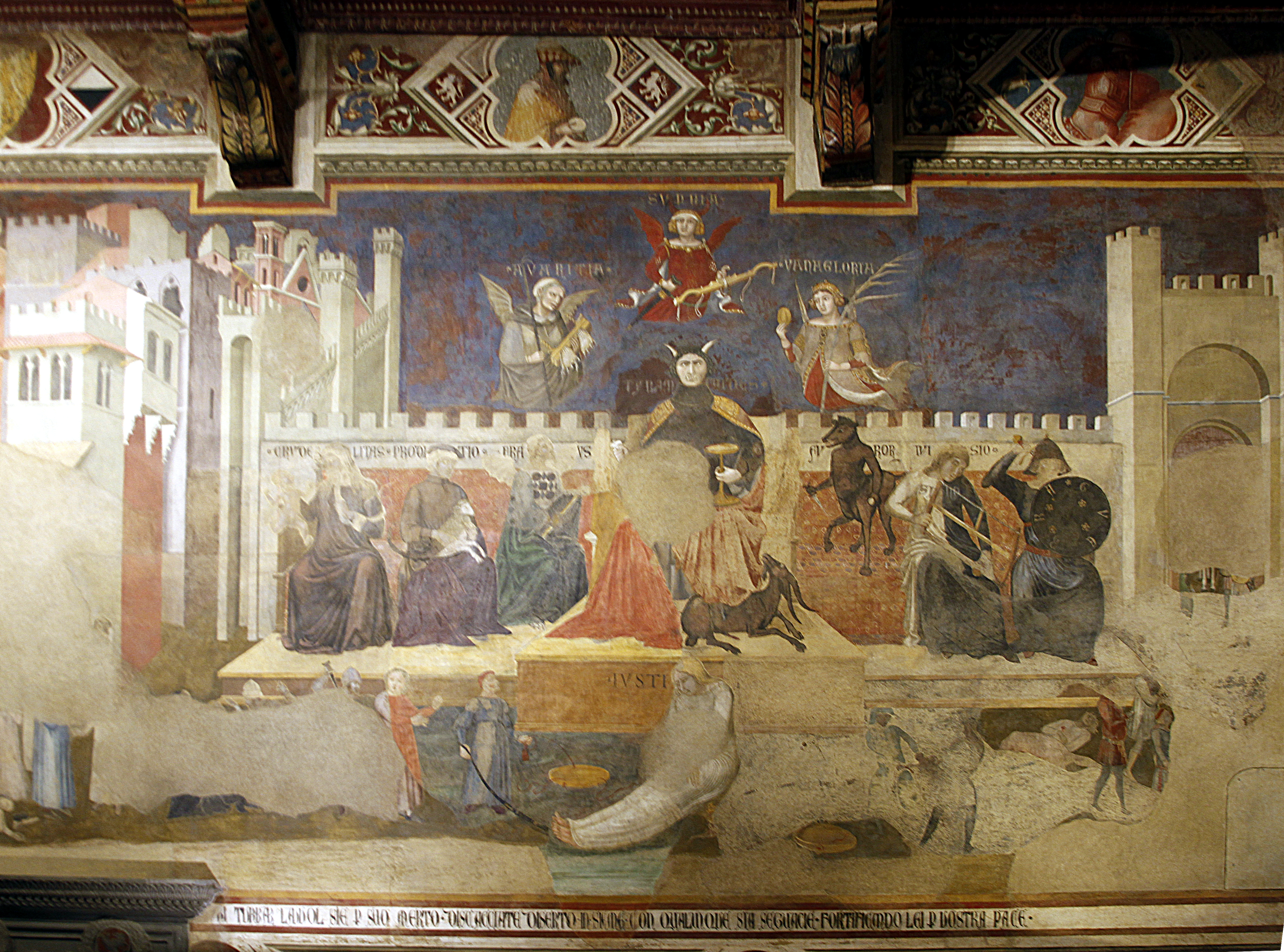
Allegory of the Bad Government

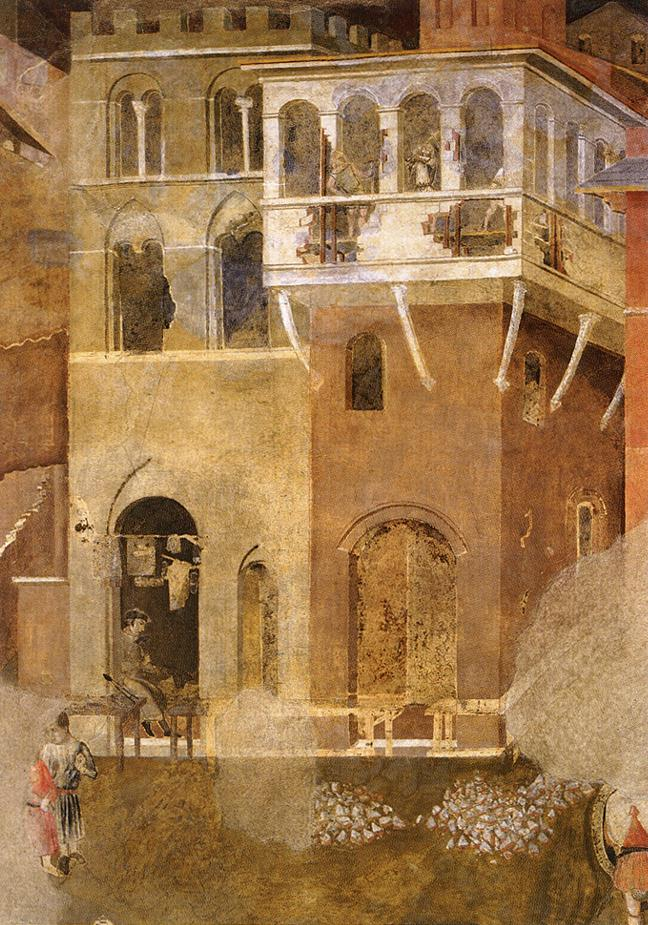
Detail of Effects of Bad Government

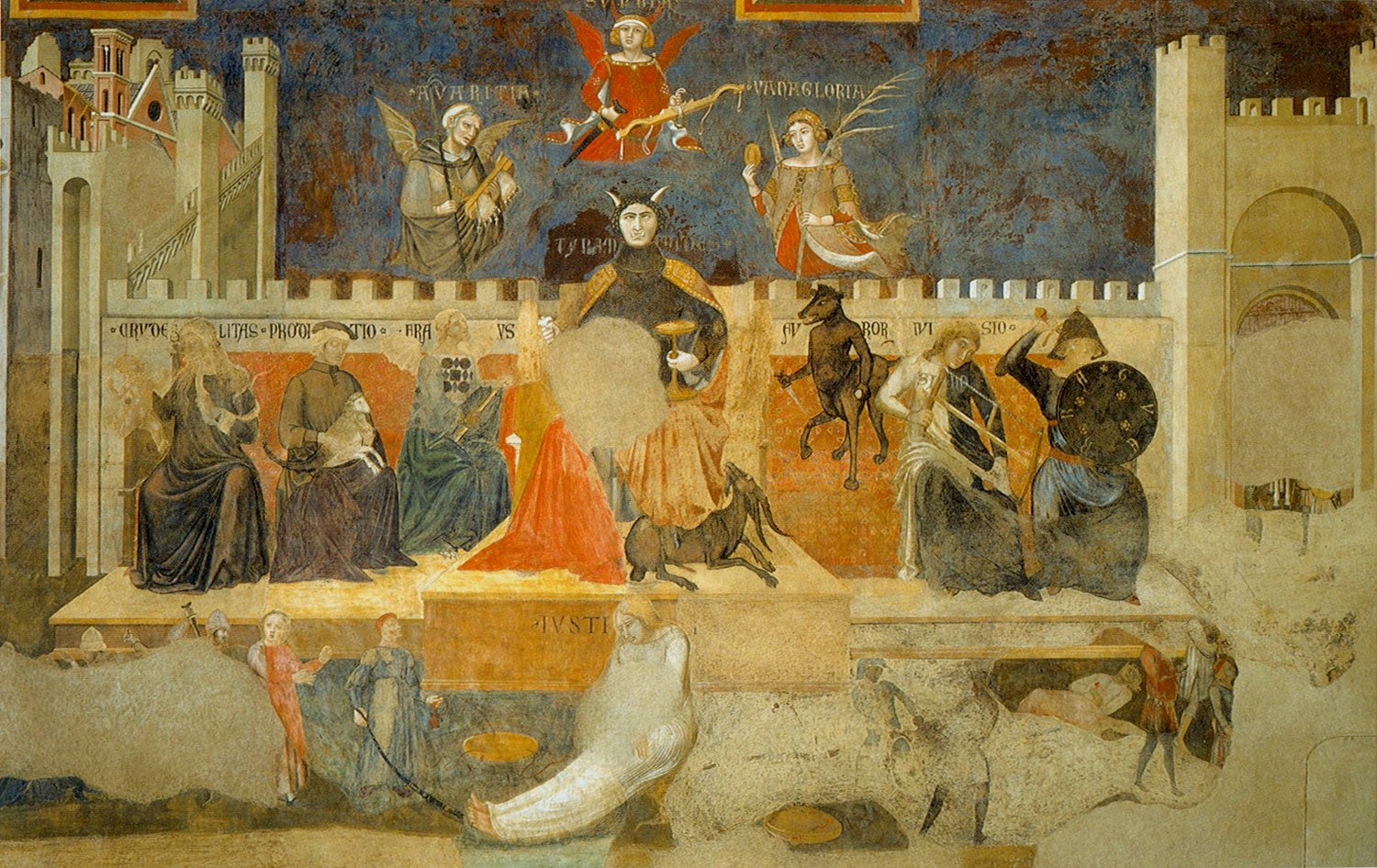
Allegory of Bad Government

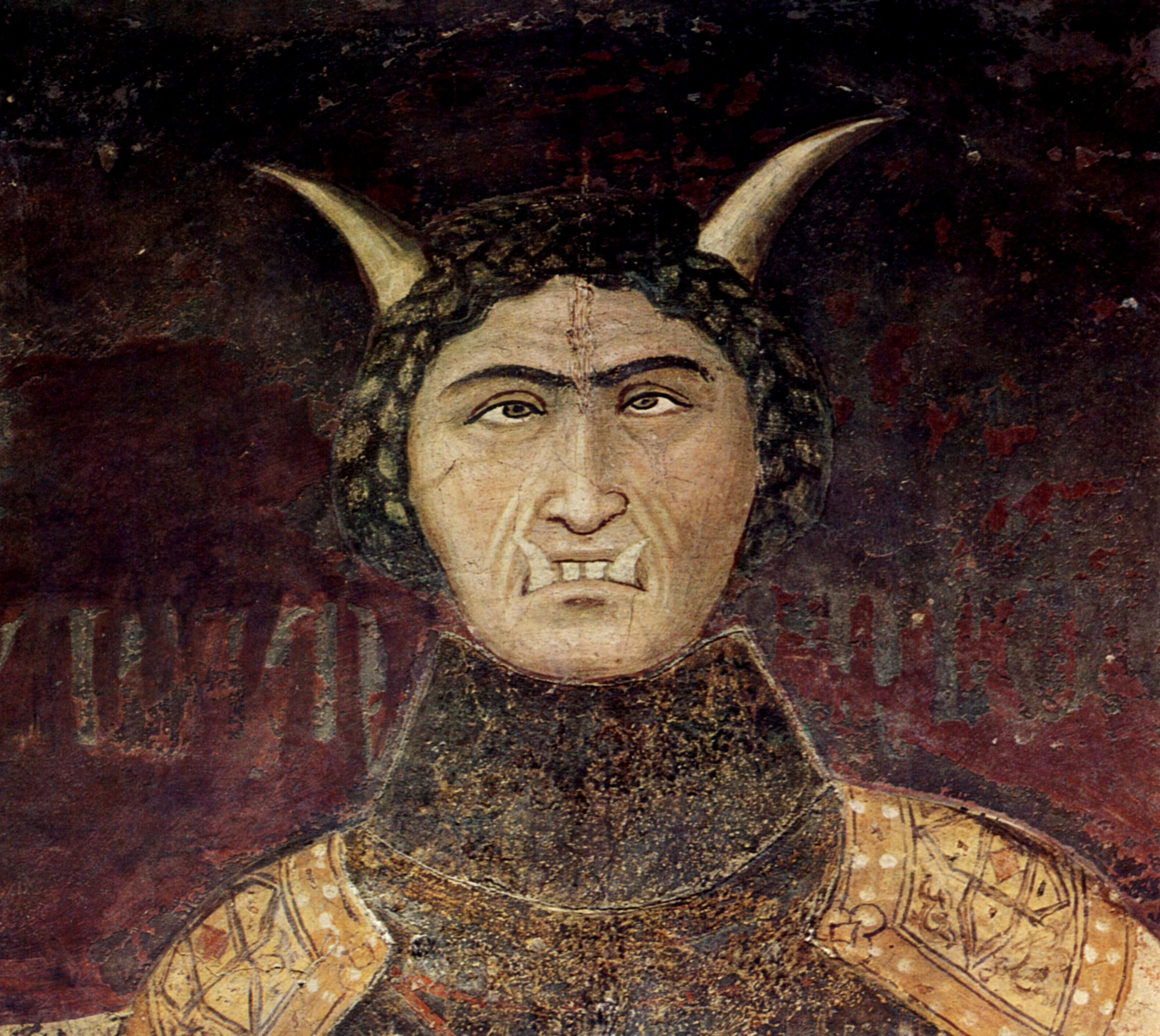
The Tyrant associated with bad government

Lorenzetti's The Effects of Bad Government fresco has not been written on so extensively as The Effects of Good Government has been, partly due to the poor condition of this fresco. The wall on which the fresco is depicted used to be an exterior wall, and has suffered much moisture damage in the past.

When viewers turn to examine this mural, they are confronted with a devious looking figure adorned with horns and fangs, appearing to be cross-eyed. This figure is identified as Tyrammides (Tyranny), who sits enthroned, resting his feet upon a goat (symbolic of luxury) while holding a dagger.

Below the tyrant, the captive figure of Justice lies bound, while the figures of Cruelty, Deceit, Fraud, Fury, Division, and War flank him, and above him float the figures of Avarice, Pride, and Vainglory. These figures, according to an advice book for city magistrates of the time, were considered to be the "leading enemies of human life". The planets of Jupiter, Saturn, and Mars preside over this scene, as they were considered as the less favorable planets; also included are tyrannical figures such as the Roman Emperor Nero.

When looking at his scene of the city with bad government, it appears very jarring; nothing fits as it should be. This is partly because Lorenzetti presented the scene in such a manner that the viewer must read it right to left, creating a sense of discomfort. When looking at the scene, the city with bad government appears to be in ruin, windows are wide open, houses are being demolished, and businesses are nonexistent, except that of the armourer, a woman is apparently being robbed by soldiers. The streets are deserted, and the countryside scene shows two armies advancing toward each other. The whole scene shows the diametrical opposite of that of The Effects of Good Government, creating a powerful reminder to the council.
