= Palazzo Pubblico =

Palace in Siena, Tuscany, Italy

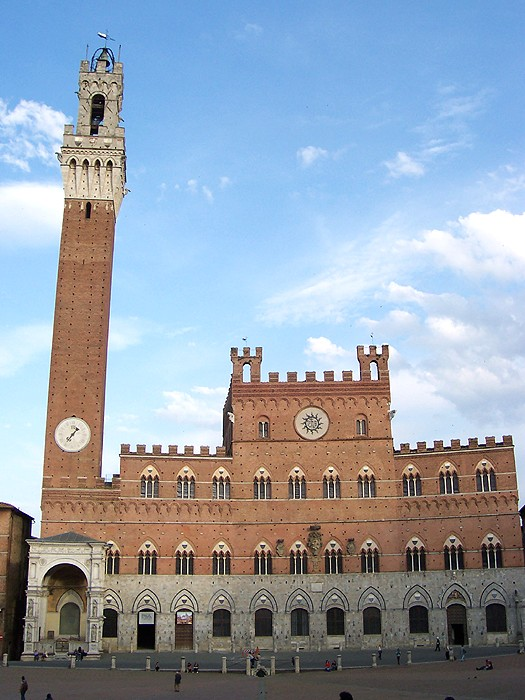
- Palazzo Pubblico and Torre del Mangia
- Interactive map of the Palazzo Pubblico area

General information
- Type: Town hall
- Architectural style: Medieval; Gothic
- Location: Piazza del Campo, Siena, Tuscany, Italy
- Coordinates: 43°19′06″N 11°19′53″E

The Palazzo Pubblico (town hall) is a historic palace in Siena, Tuscany, in central Italy. Located on the Piazza del Campo, it is one of the principal architectural landmarks of the city's historic center. Construction began in 1297 to serve as the seat of the Republic of Siena's government, which consisted of the Podestà and Council of Nine, the elected officials who performed executive functions (and judicial ones in secular matters). The palace is of medieval and Gothic architecture, and the interior is lined with frescoes--most importantly, the collection known as The Allegory of Good and Bad Government by Ambrogio Lorenzetti.

== Architecture ==
The outside of the structure is an example of Italian medieval architecture with Gothic influences. The lower story is stone while the upper crenellated stories are made of brick. At a time when brick as a finished face was rare, Siena preferred it to stone because it was cheaper; this allowed architects to use more expensive detailing elsewhere. The façade of the palace is curved slightly inwards (concave) to reflect the outwards curve (convex) of the Piazza del Campo, Siena's central square, of which the Palace is the focal point. At the top of this façade is a huge round flat bronze plate Christogram, the symbol used by Saint Bernardino. It was placed there by the government in 1425 in gratitude to the great preacher, a native Sienese, for his sermons aimed at quelling social and political factionalism and unrest.

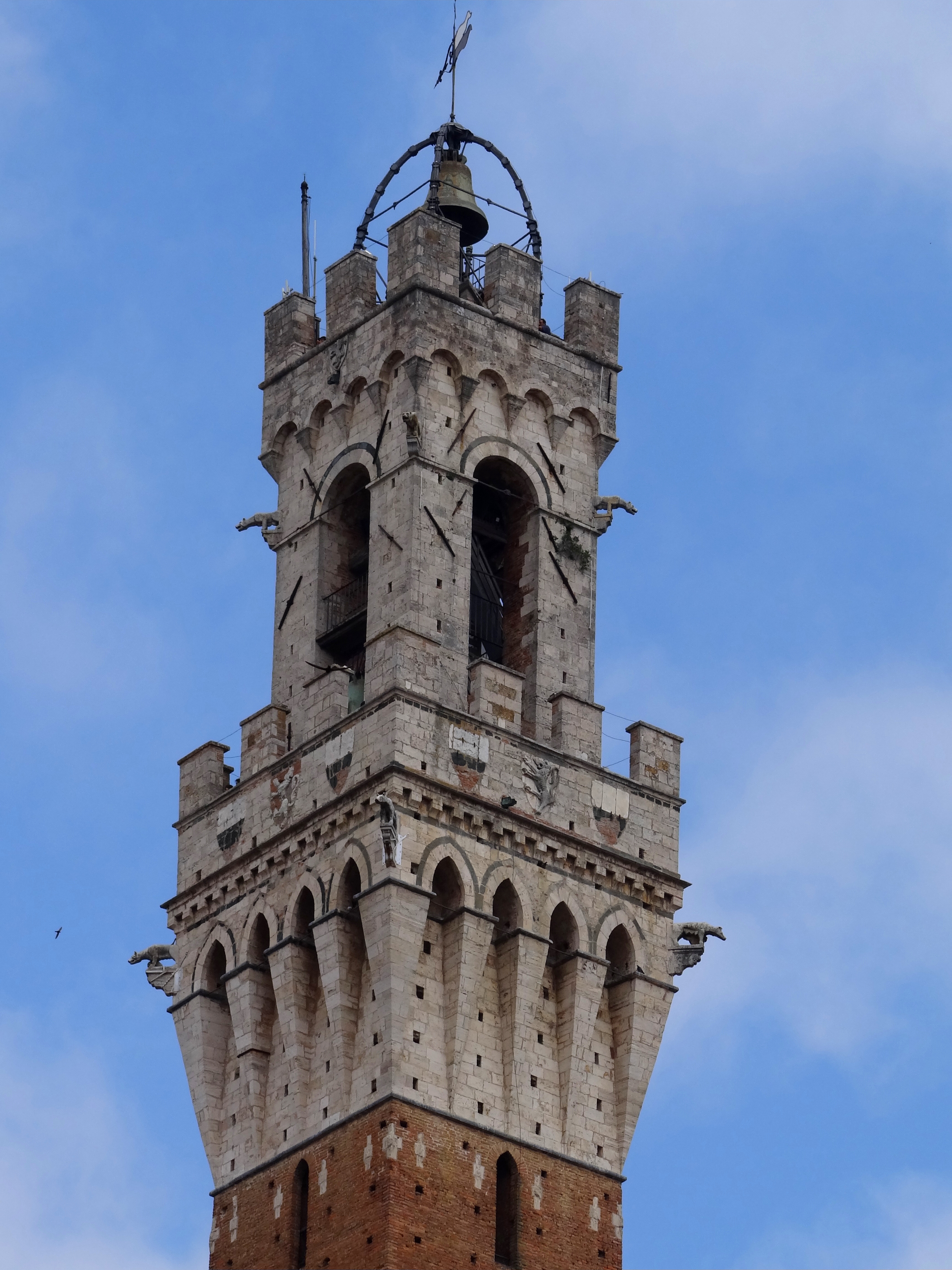
The crown of Palazzo Pubblico

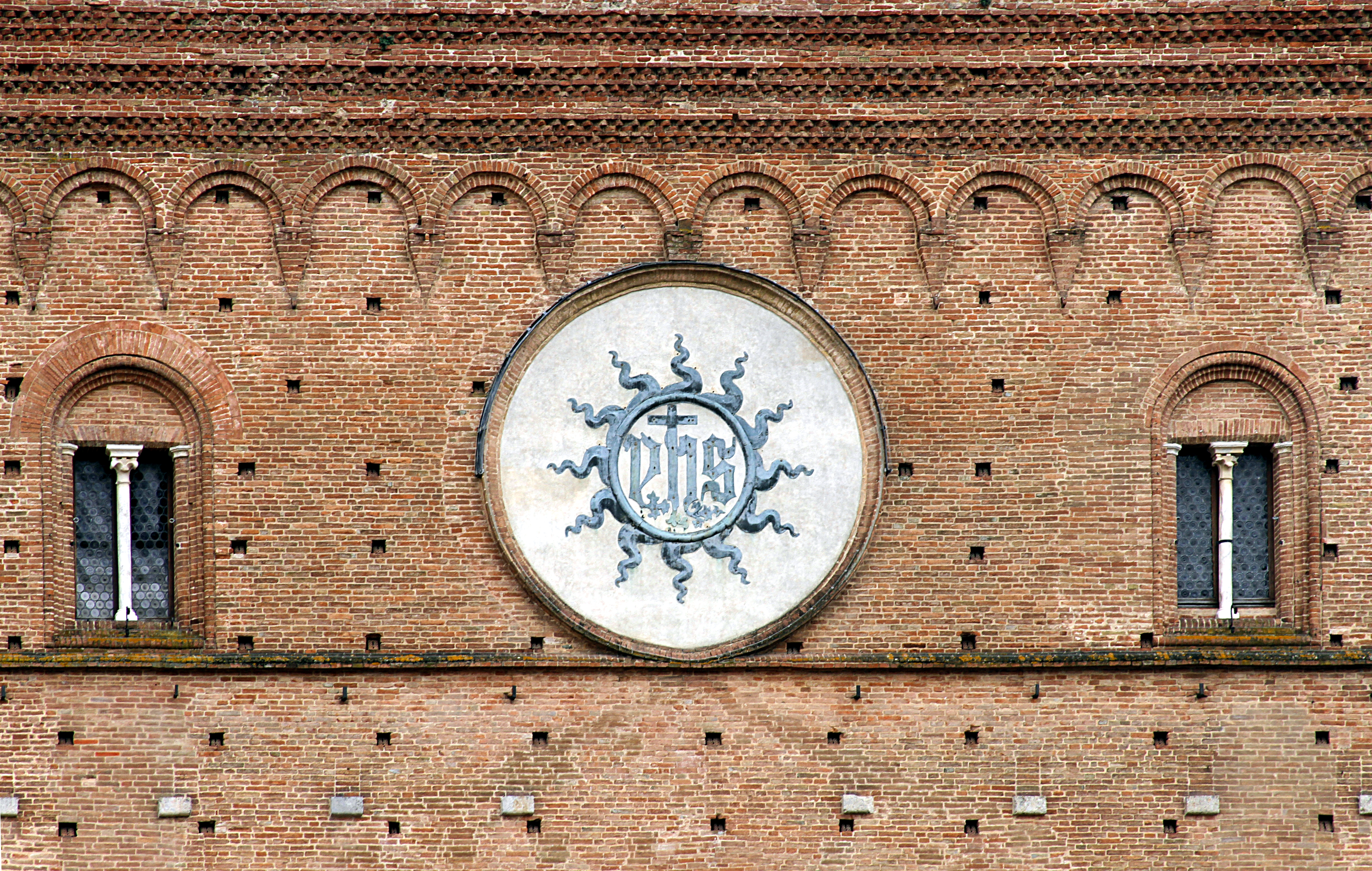
Palazzo Pubblico's Christogram

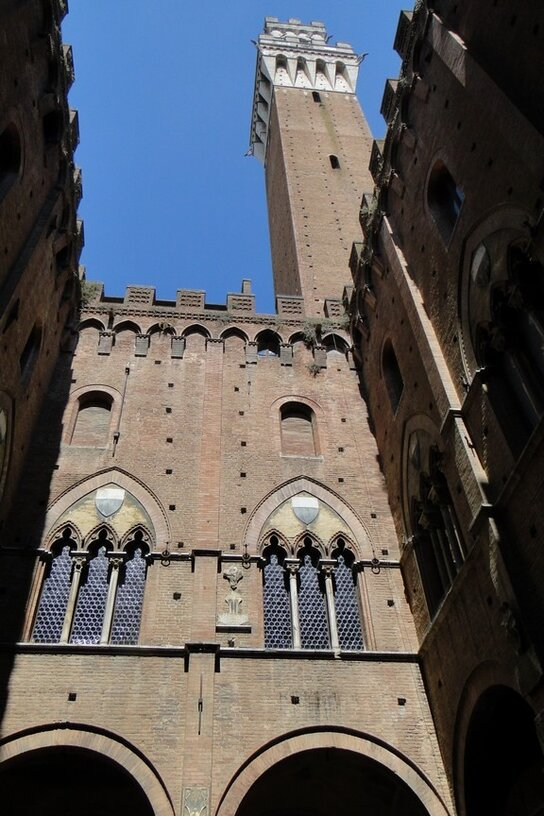
Palazzo Pubblico and the Clock tower

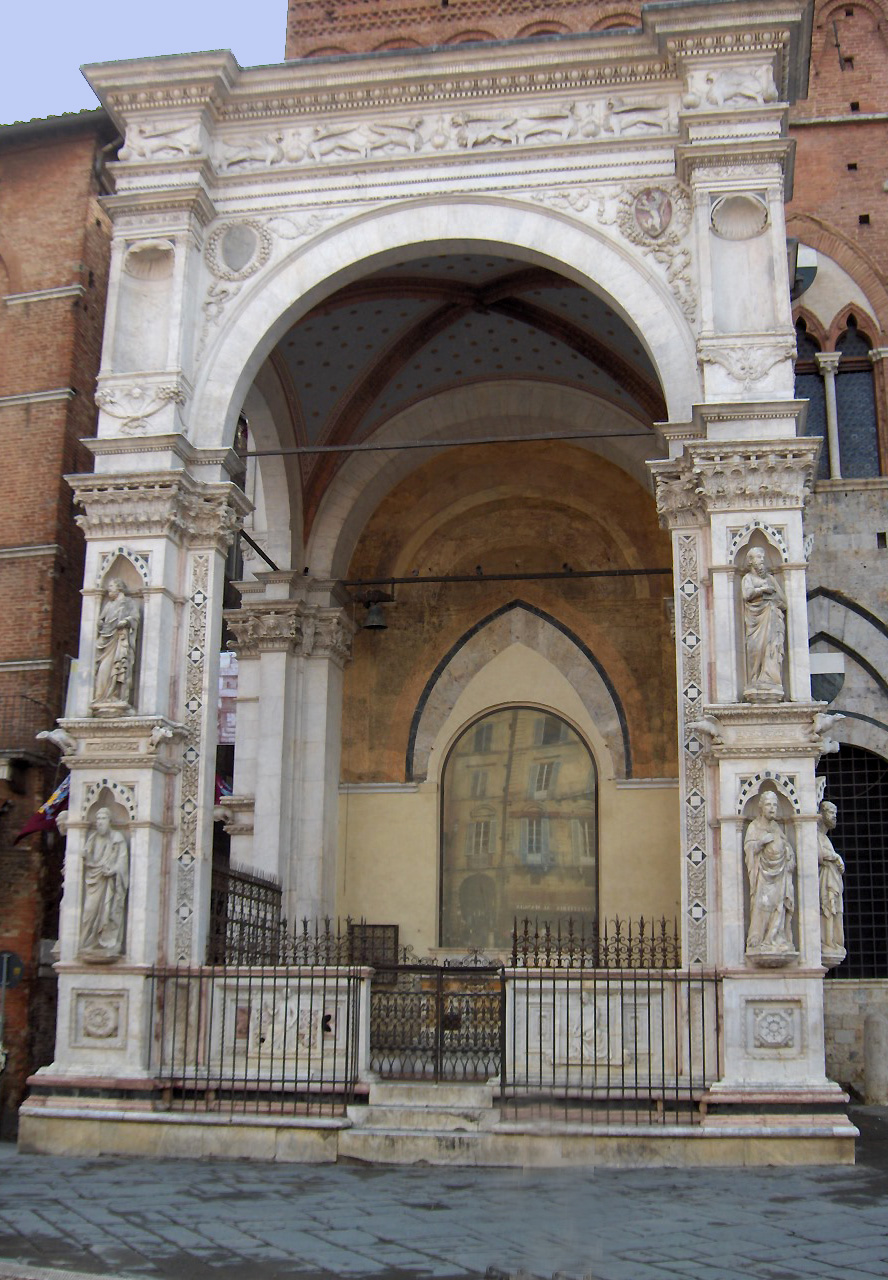
Cappella di Piazza

The campanile or bell tower, Torre del Mangia, was built between 1325 and 1344; its crown was designed by the painter Lippo Memmi. The tower was designed to be taller than the tower in neighboring rival Florence; at the time it was the tallest structure in Italy. It was fitted with a mechanical clock during the mid-14th century. Its design has been used as the basis for several other campaniles, including the Dock Tower in Grimsby, England, constructed in 1852 and the Joseph Chamberlain Memorial Clock Tower in the Edgbaston campus of the University of Birmingham, which was completed in 1908.

The upper-story windows of the Palazzo are heavily ornamented trefoil arches, typical of Sienese architecture. The pointed arches of all of the windows are a clear example of Gothic influence.

== Frescoes ==
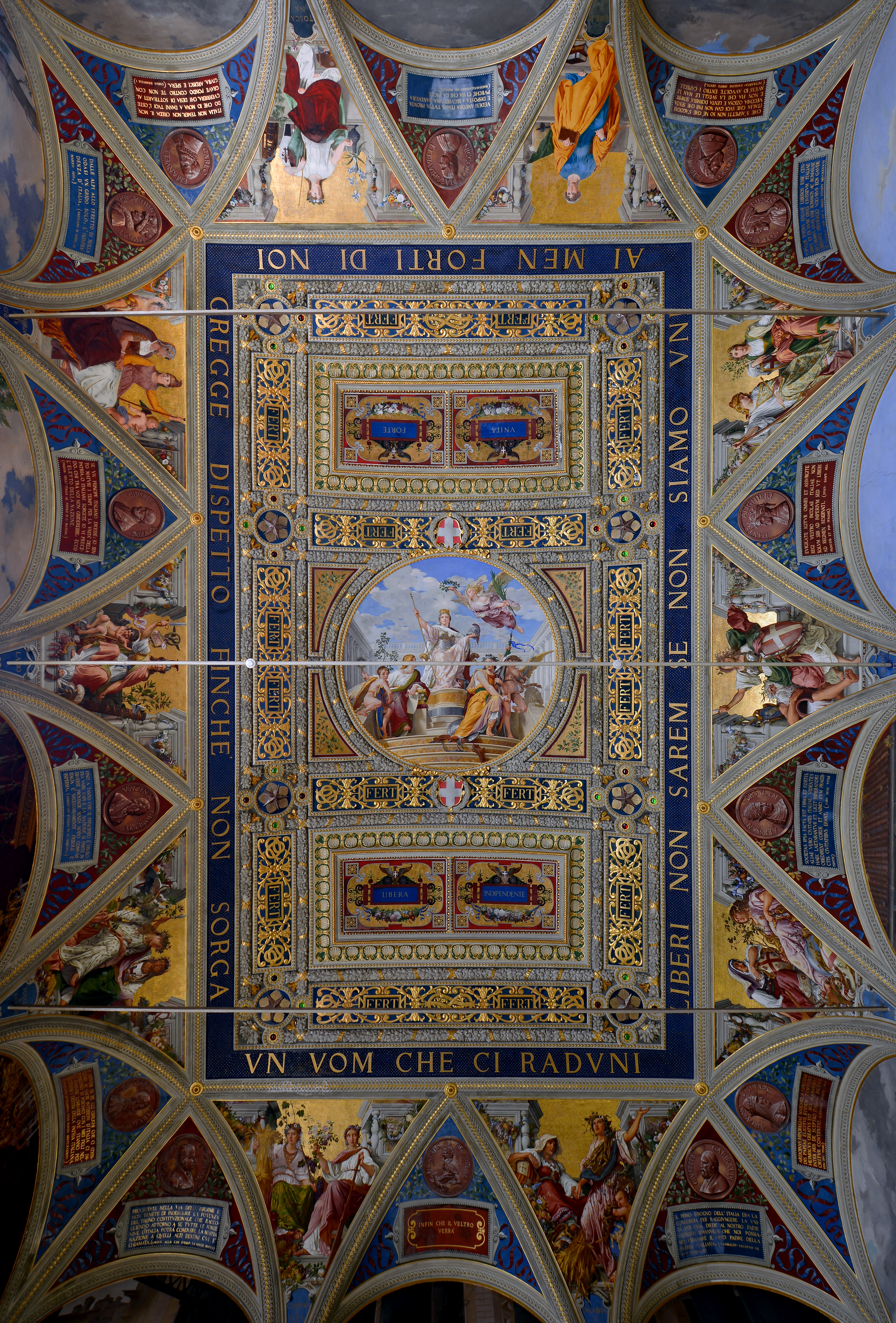
Room of the Risorgimento

Nearly every major room in the palace contains frescoes. These were unusual for the time in that they were commissioned by the governing body of the city, rather than by the Church or by a religious fraternity. They are also unusual in that many of them depict secular subjects instead of the religious subjects which are overwhelmingly typical of Italian art of this era. Although these frescoes are secular in origin and overall theme, the ideas are expressed within a religious framework: scriptural verses are quoted on the frescoes.

The most famous of the secular frescoes are three panels in the series on government in the Hall of the Nine (also known as Sala della Pace) by Ambrogio Lorenzetti.

These frescoes are collectively known as The Allegory of Good and Bad Government.

The Allegory of Good Government depicts the personification of Justice as a woman. She gestures to the scales of balance, held by the personification of Wisdom floating over her throne. On the viewer's left, a convicted criminal is beheaded; on the right, figures receive the rewards of justice. At Justice's feet, the personification of Virtue, also, unusually for the time, portrayed as a female figure, passes virtue among 24 faithfully rendered and recognizable images of prominent male citizens of Siena. The men face towards the largest figure in the image, a judge located in the center right. The judge is surrounded by additional personifications including Peace, who is represented as a fashionable, white-clad contemporary female figure with elaborate blonde hair. Concordia joins the cords of peace and welfare that she receives from Justice and gives it to the citizens, who pull this rope together to bind the wrist of Sovereignty. Each personified virtue is titled in its place, so there is no doubt about what each figure represents. The meaning of this fresco is clear: good government will make the people prosper.

The allegory carries a strong social message of the value of the stable republican government of Siena. It combines elements of secular life with references to the importance of religion: Justice resembles Mary, Queen of Heaven, the patron saint of Siena, on a throne; the Judge reflects the tradition in the Christian Last Judgment to have God or Christ judging the saved on the left and the damned on the right. While classified as medieval or proto (pre)-renaissance art, these paintings show a transition from earlier religious art.

Flanking the Allegory are two other paintings on perpendicular walls: Effects of Good Government and Effects of Bad Government. Both these frescoes depict a recognizable view of Siena and its countryside.

In the allegorical representation of Good Government, the prosperous townspeople are trading and dancing in the streets. Beyond the city walls is a lush countryside in which crops are harvested.

In the allegory of Bad Government, crime is rampant and diseased citizens roam a crumbling city; the countryside suffers from drought.

Many of the frescoes in the Palace, including these, are badly damaged potentially due to salt once stored in the basement of the building. It is theoretically possible that the salts wicked moisture down from the walls, causing the plaster to dry excessively and the frescoes to flake off.

Other frescoes include that of Guidoriccio da Fogliano at the siege of Montemassi, located in the Great Council Hall (Sala del Mappamondo). The fresco is traditionally attributed to Simone Martini, although there is debate on the subject. The wall has circular markings left by the circular wall-mounted (now lost) map of the world by Ambrogio Lorenzetti. Hidden underneath this fresco is the New Fresco, plastered over and partly painted over. This fresco depicts two men standing alongside a town on a hill. The fresco is in poor condition from being painted over and its origin and intent remain unknown. It, also, is damaged by Lorenzetti's circular map of the world.

Siena was decimated by the Black Death in 1348; approximately half of its population died in the plague. The republic's economy was destroyed and the state quickly declined from its position of prominence in Italy. The Franciscan religious order rose to power in the city. The stagnation over the following centuries meant that while Siena did not develop during the Renaissance as did other Italian cities, it was also preserved both from bombardment during World War II and from modern development.

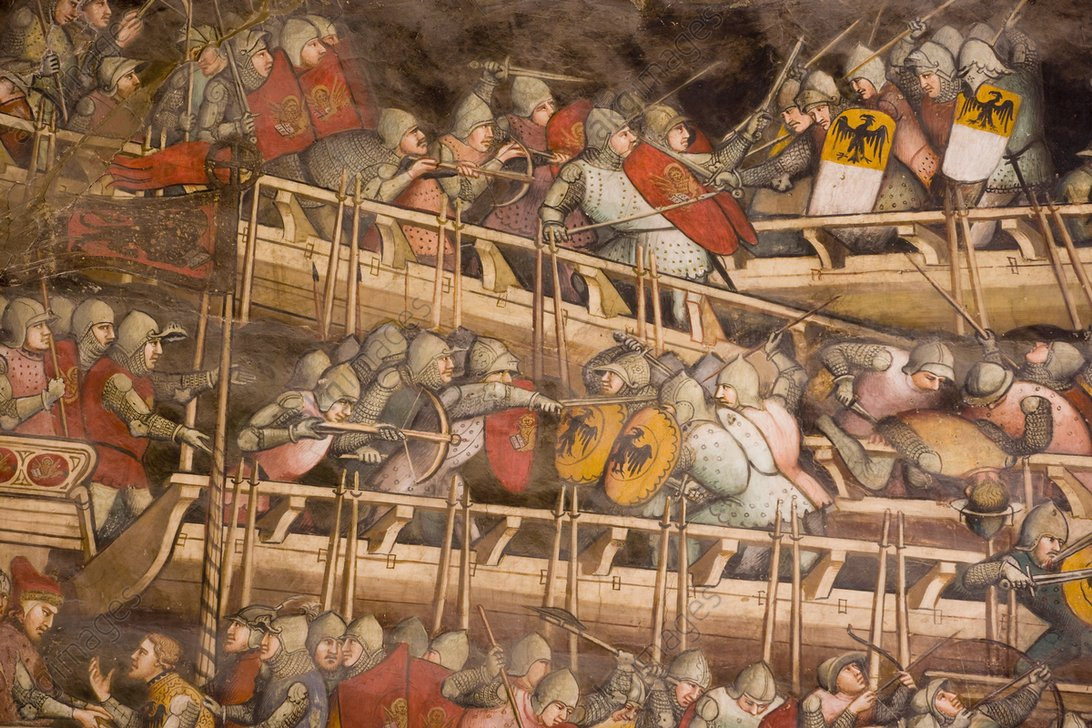
Naval Battle of Punta San Salvatore by Spinello Aretino

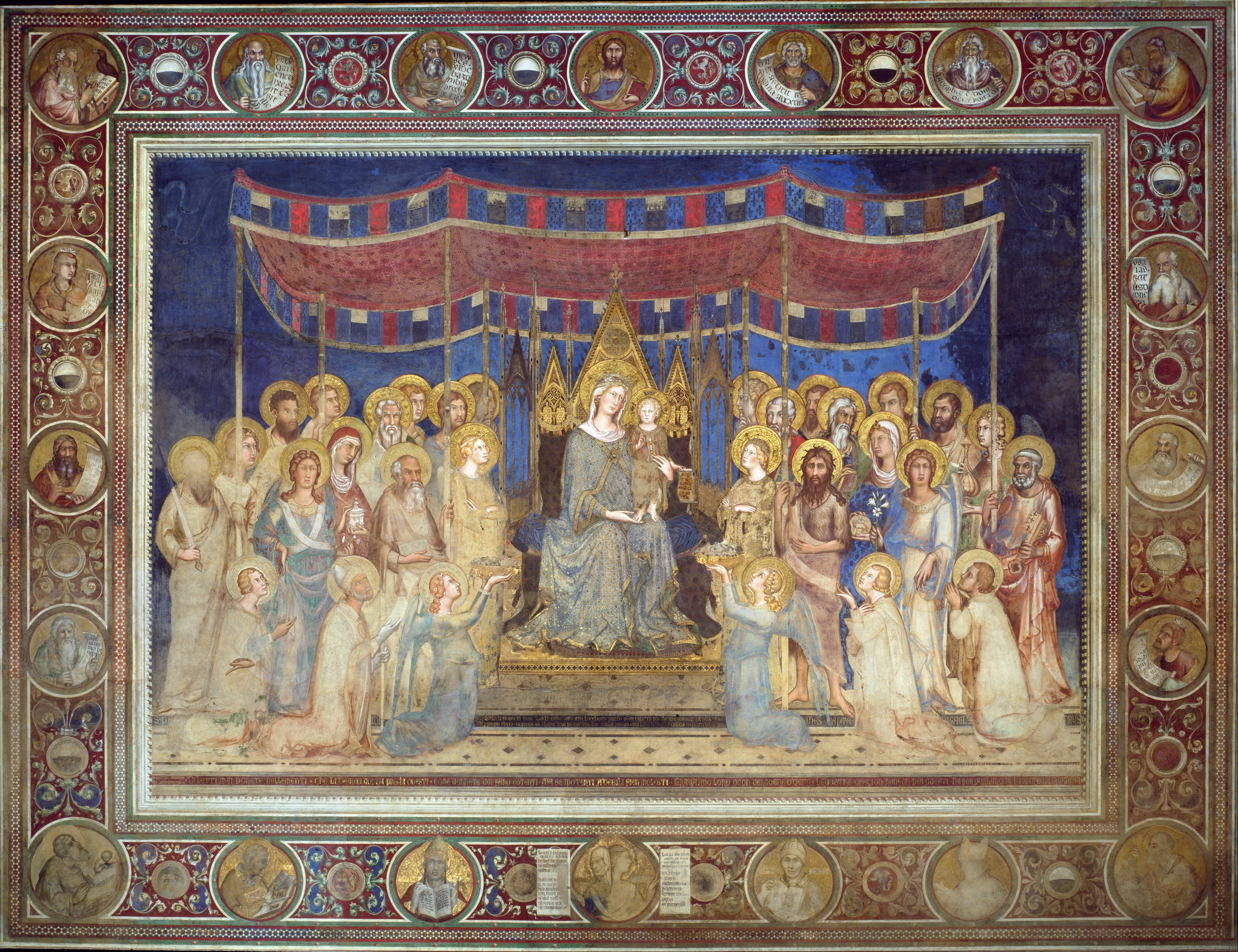
Maestà by Simone Martini

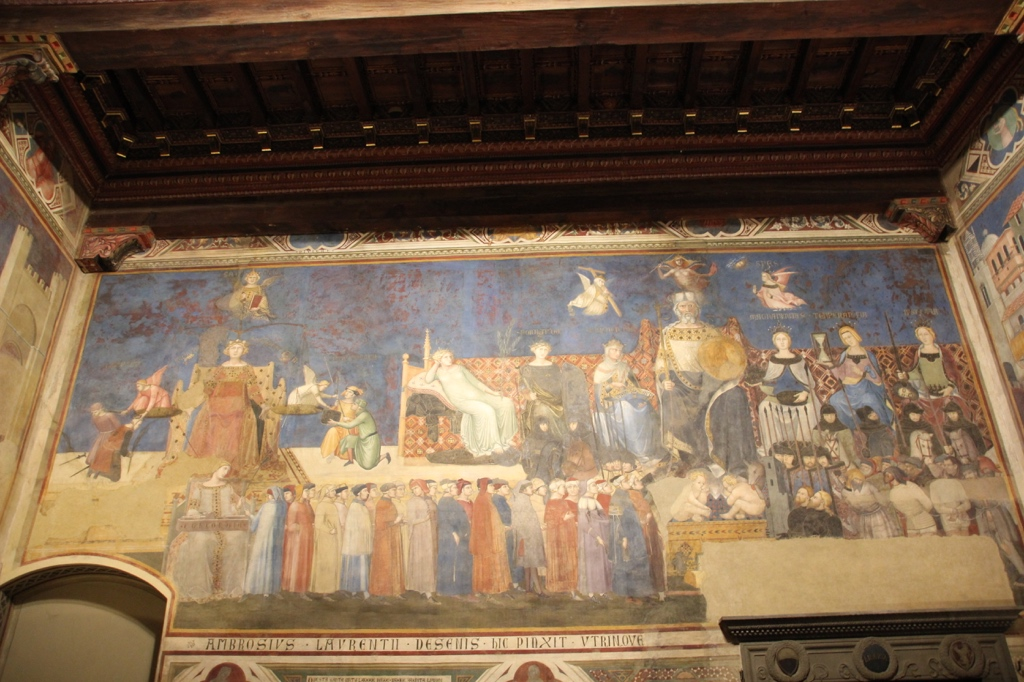
Allegory of Good Government by Lorenzetti

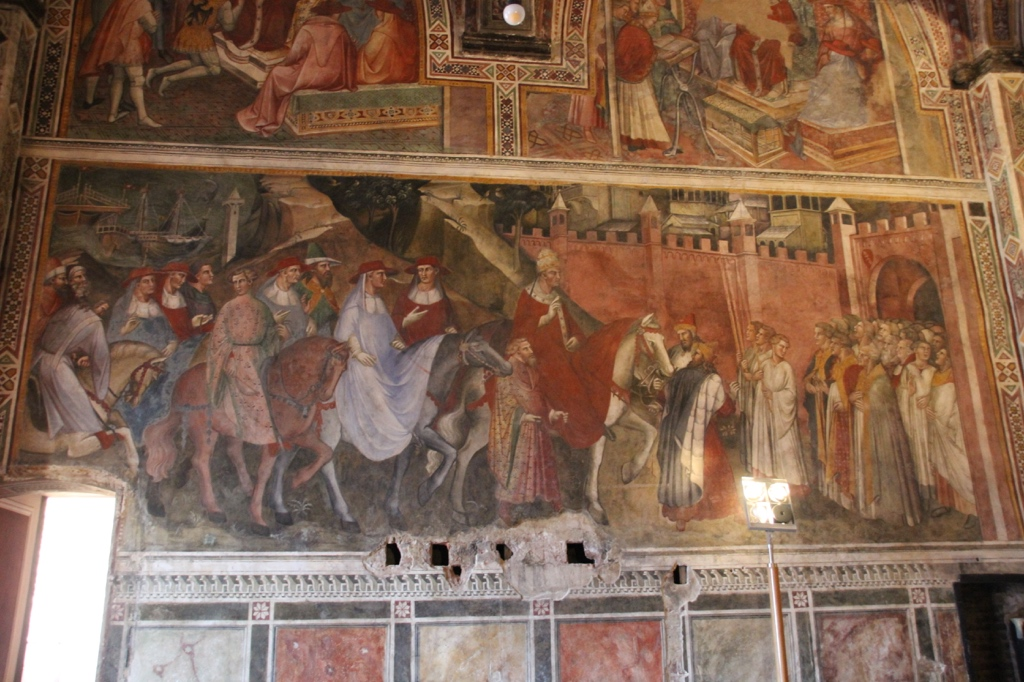
Pope Alexander III returns to Rome by Spinello Aretino

== See also ==
- Annunciation (Ambrogio Lorenzetti), a painting originally in the palace
- The Allegory of Good and Bad Government, a fresco by Ambrogio Lorenzetti
