= Jacopo di Mino del Pellicciaio =

Italian painter

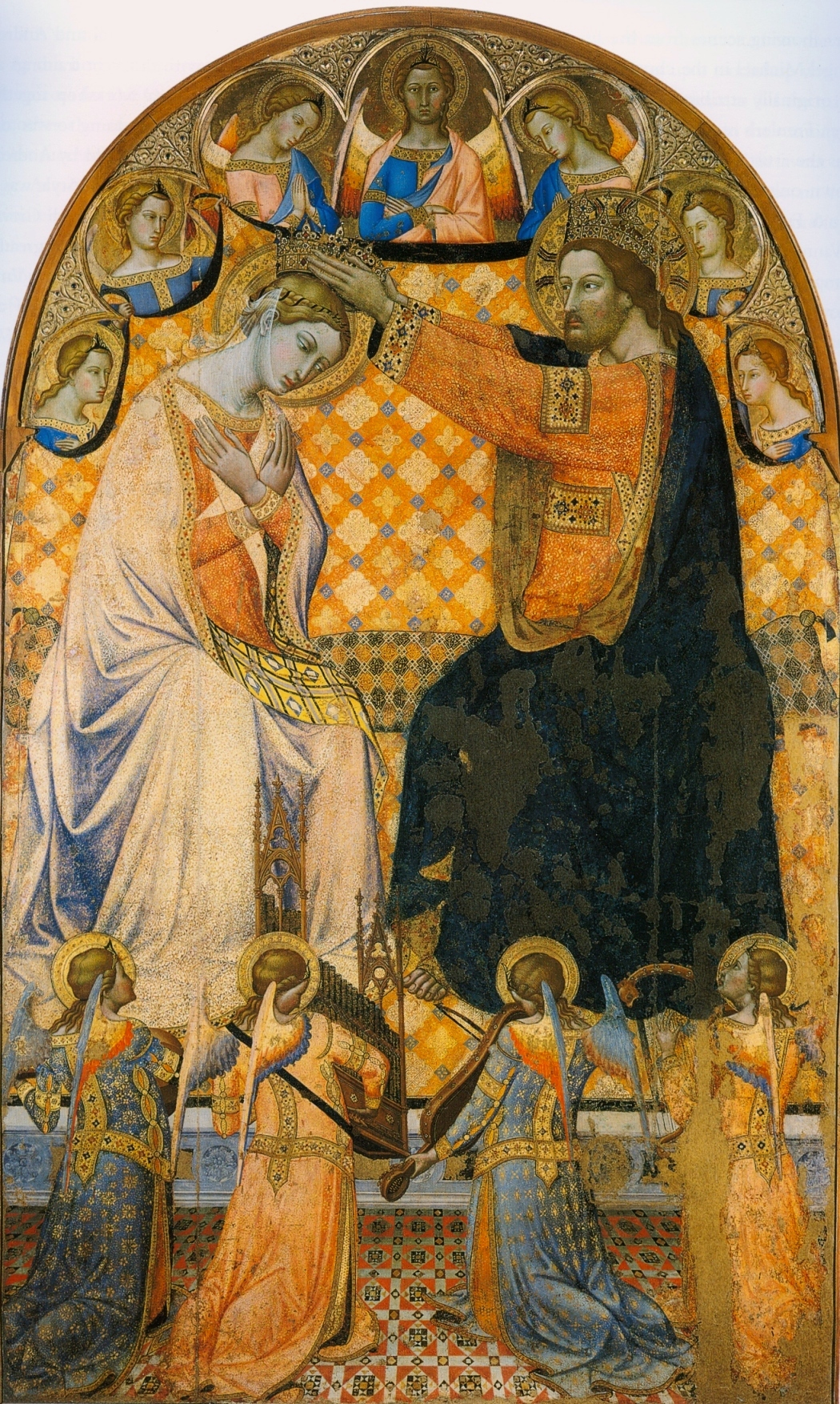
Coronation of the Virgin of 1340–1350, typical of the smaller Gothic depictions of the subject

Jacopo di Mino del Pellicciaio (14th century) was an Italian painter, active in Siena.

== Biography ==
He worked in the middle of the 14th century in Siena and in the region of Umbria. Here he followed Simone Martini in his early years. His Madonna col bambino, also known as Madonna del cardellino, was painted around 1344 and can be admired in the church of San Martino in Foro in Sarteano. A coronation of the Virgin Mary (Incoronazione della Vergine, created around 1350) by him is in the Museo Civico di Montepulciano in Montepulciano. A document from 1362 documents his collaboration with Bartolomeo Bulgarini and Luca di Tommè in work on the Maestà of Duccio di Buoninsegna. Other known works can be found in Siena in the Basilica di San Clemente in Santa Maria dei Servi (Madonna del Belvedere, painted around 1363, could also be by Taddeo di Bartolo) and in the Pinacoteca Nazionale di Siena (Crocifissione con San Francesco, Incoronazione di Santa Caterina d'Alessandria e santi and Madonna col bambino e i SS. Chiara, Giovanni Battista, Agostino, Francesco). In 1382 he received payments for work on the facade of the Baptistery of Siena Cathedral. He was also active in Città della Pieve and Todi.

He is also called Giacomo di Mino. He appears to be a follower of Simone Martini. He was the contemporary of Lippo Vanni and Luca Thome, being, in 1373, appointed to value one of the latter's pictures. His name appears in the Sienese records from 1362 to 1389. In 1367, he aided Bartolo di Maestro Fredi at the Siena cathedral. He is known to have painted book-covers for the Biccherna, and was several times a member of the Grand Council of Siena. He frescoed for the Basilica of San Francesco.

Milanesi mentions a Sienese painter 'Giacomo del Pellicciaio of the order of Friars Minor (Frate Minore).
