= San Francesco, Lucignano =

Church in Lucignano, Italy

Coordinates: 43°16′29″N 11°44′47″E

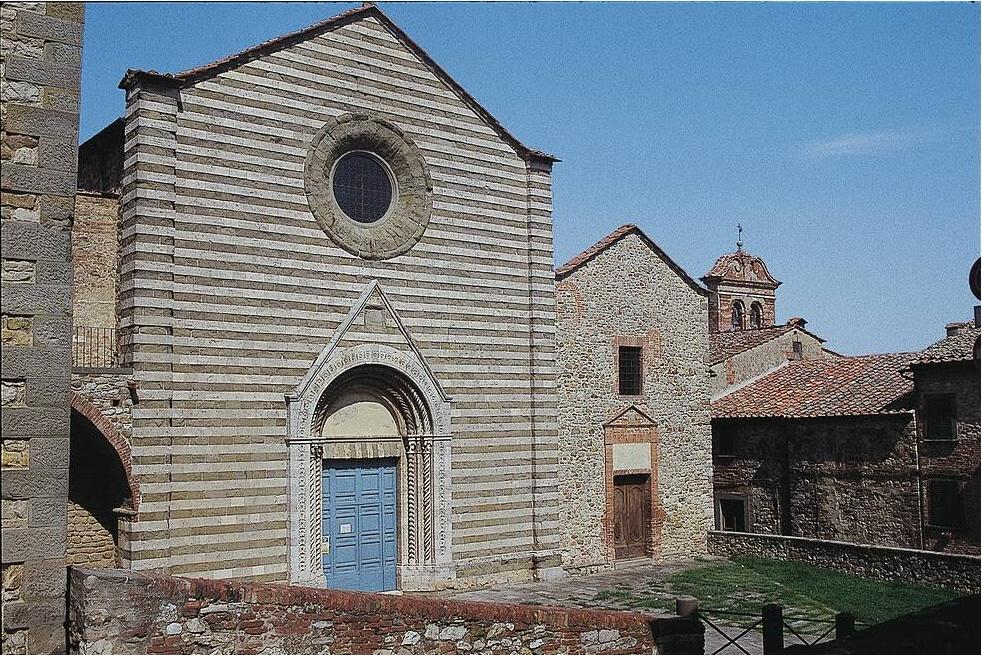
Facade of church

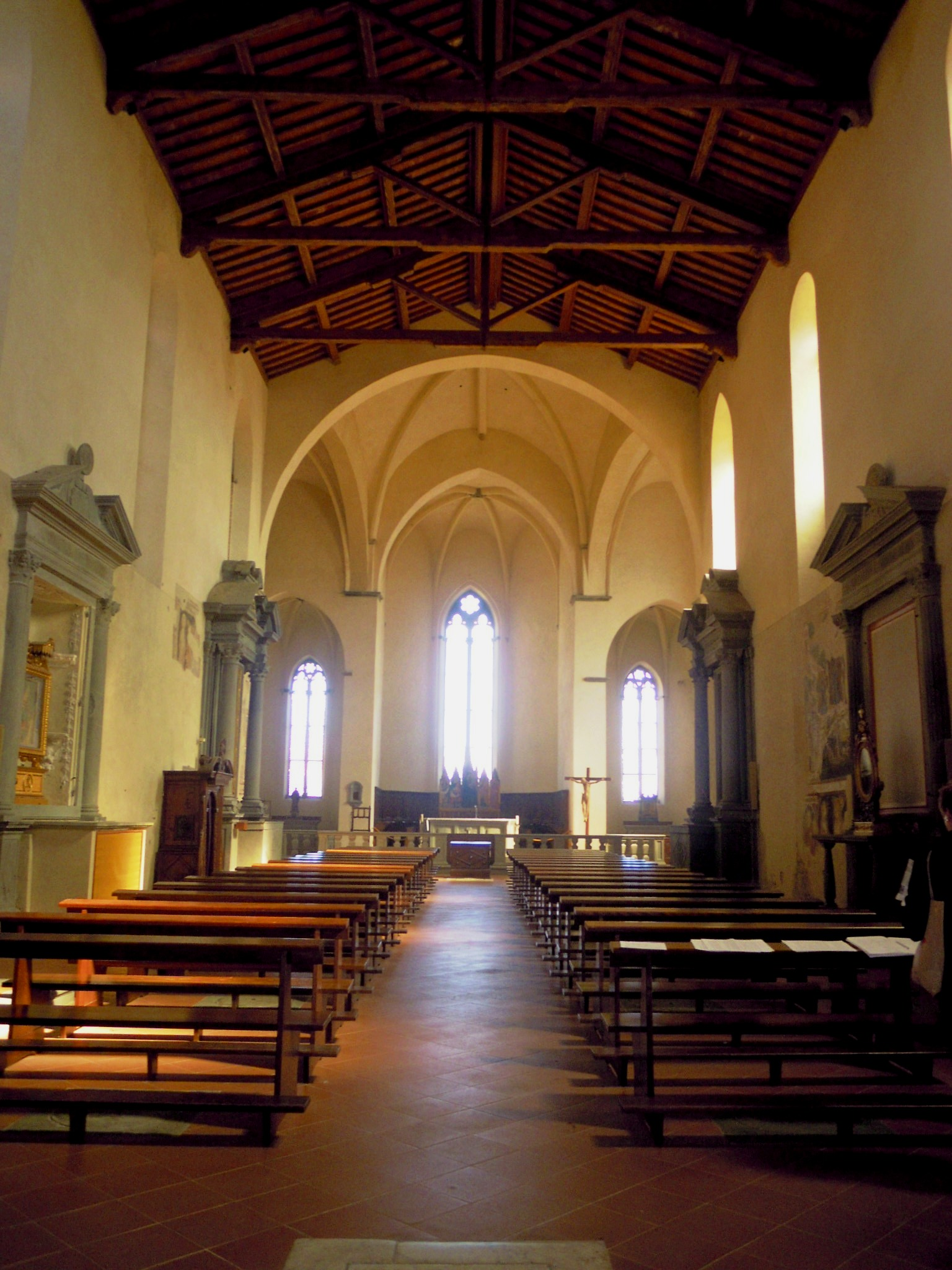
Interior of church

San Francesco is a Romanesque- and Gothic-style Roman Catholic church located in the center of Lucignano, region of Tuscany, Italy.

== History ==
The church is first mentioned as belonging to Frati Minori in 1289. The church with a bicolored (travertine marble and pietra serena) facade has a rose window in the center. The rounded portal is highly decorated with spiraling pilasters. The apse has a series of vaults with Gothic tracery. Nineteenth century restoration by Castellucci removed much of the plaster obscuring earlier frescoes, and altars that were shuttering windows.

The interior with a single nave has a collection of frescoes from the 15th and 16th centuries. Including Scenes from the Life of St Francis by Bartolo di Fredi and Taddeo di Bartolo. The first altar right of main altar has a fresco depicting a grim Triumph of Death by Bartolo; in the painting, death as a horseman, dressed in black on a black horse, bears upon two conversing noblemen. There is a large polyptych of Madonna and Saints by Luca di Tomme.

Much of the artwork of this church has been lost or dispersed. Vasari recounts of some painted and bejeweled cabinet-reliquary by Luca Signorelli. A canvas of the Virgin in the church is also attributed to the school of Signorelli.

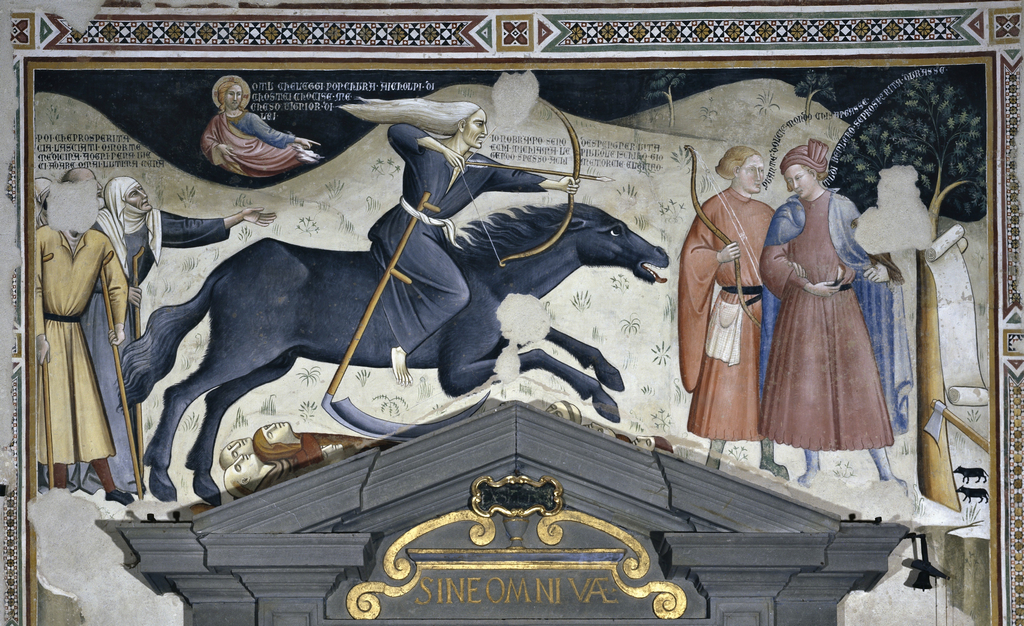
Triumph of Death Fresco attributed to Bartolo di Fredi.
