= Domenico di Bartolo =

Early Renaissance Italian painter

- Born: Domenico Ghezzi; Asciano, Siena
- Died: by 18 February 1446
- Known for: Painting
- Notable work: The Madonna of Humility and Four Music-Making Angels

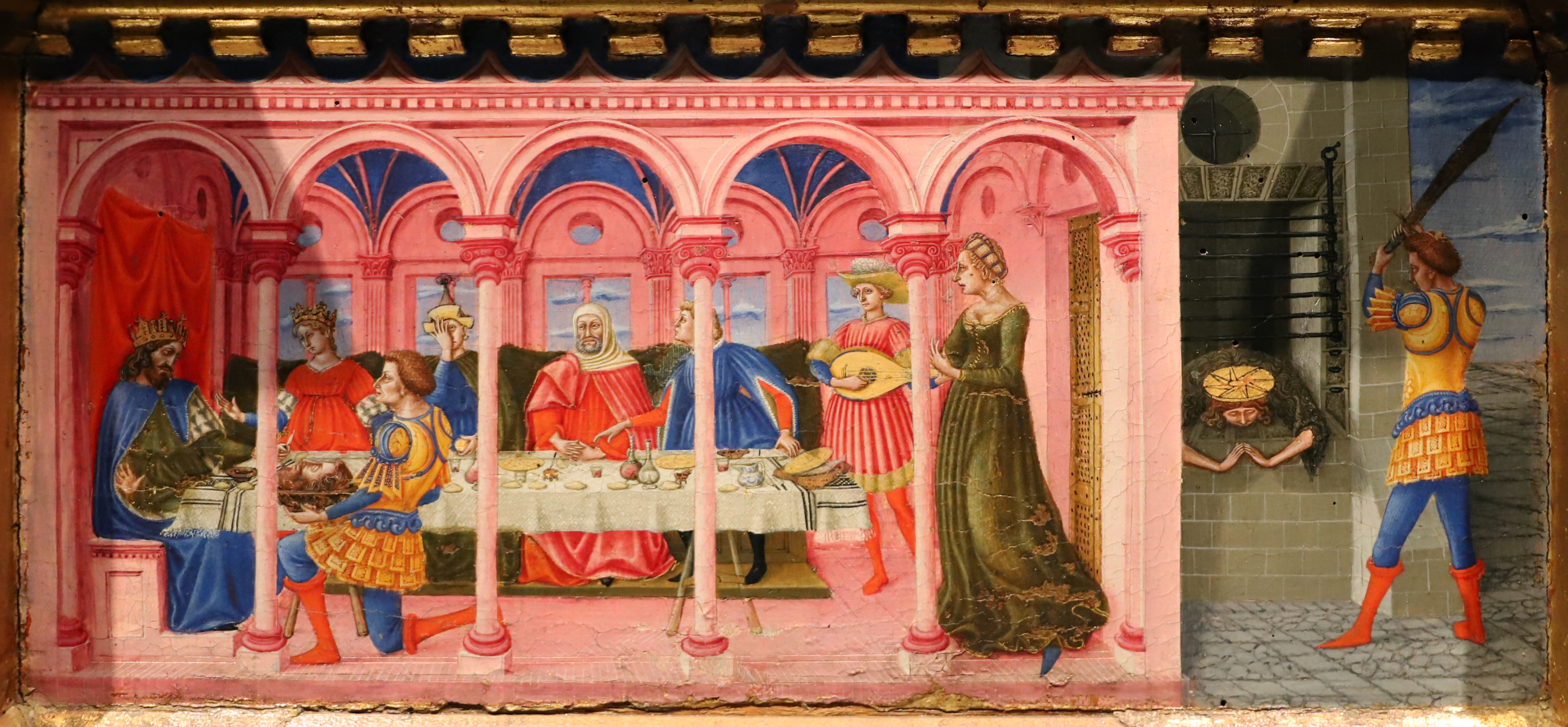
Predella scene with the death of John the Baptist, 1438

Domenico di Bartolo (birth name Domenico Ghezzi), born in Asciano, Siena, was a Sienese painter of the early Renaissance period. In the Lives of the Most Excellent Painters, Sculptors, and Architects, Giorgio Vasari says that Domenico was the nephew of Taddeo di Bartolo. Influenced by the new Florentine style of painting, Domenico di Bartolo was the only Sienese painter of his time to receive commissions from clients in Florence. In Siena, he was employed by Lorenzo di Pietro (known as Vecchietta), to help execute the fresco The Care of the Sick, in the Pilgrim's Hall of the Hospital of Santa Maria della Scala.

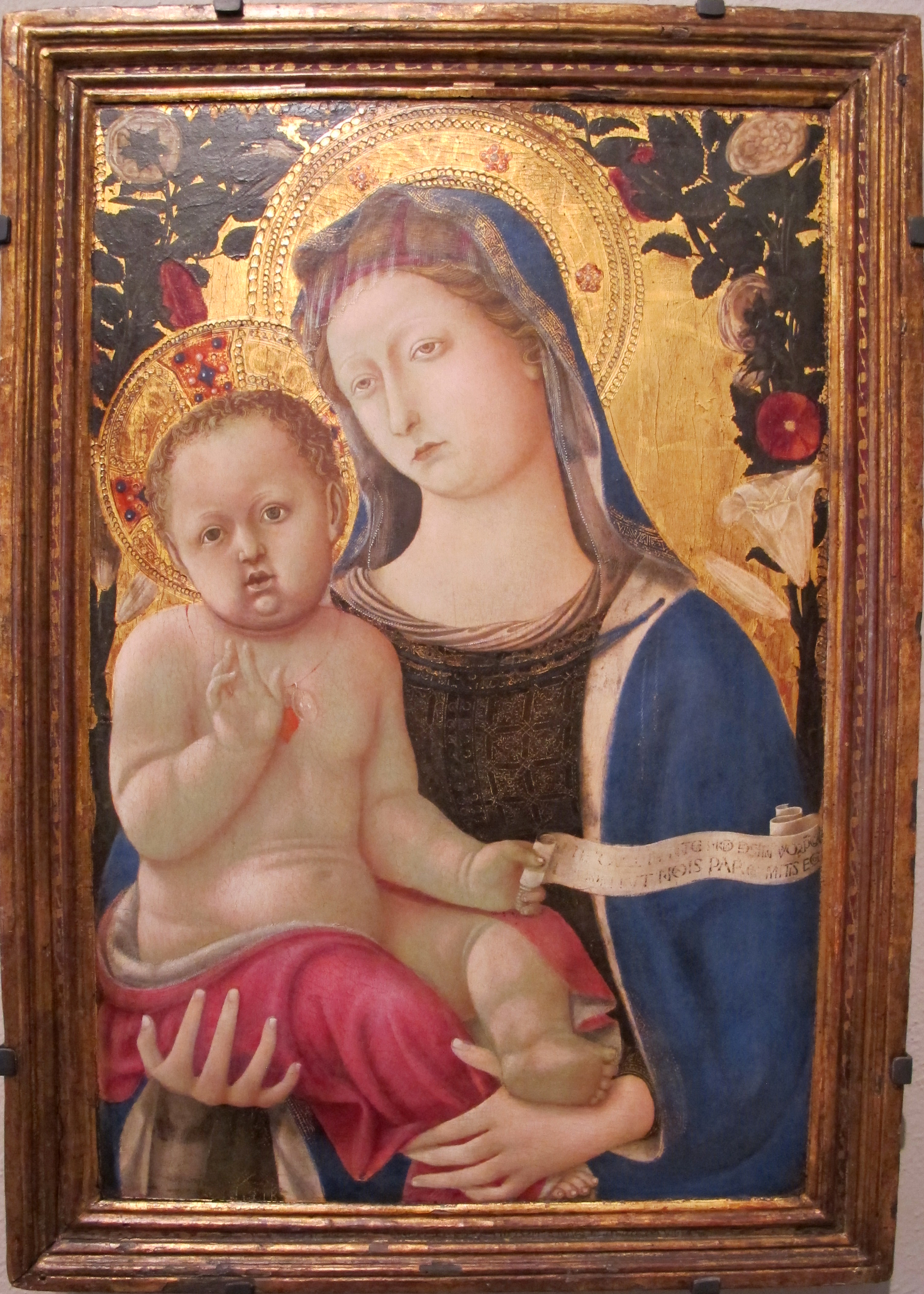
Madonna and Child, 1437

Domenico is first recorded in 1420 when he and several other Sienese artists, is documented as part of a project to paint in Siena Cathedral. He is first recorded as a master in 1428, in a list of the painters' guild (ruolo dei pittori). His first surviving signed and dated work comes from 1433: The Madonna of Humility and Four Music-Making Angels. In 1433 he also painted the Virgin and Child Surrounded by Saints. A year later, in 1434, Domenico provided a design for a pavement plaque in Siena Cathedral, based on a drawing of the Emperor Sigismund, who stayed in Siena from 1432 to 1433. From 1435 to 1440 Domenico was engaged in a fresco commission for the cathedral's sacristy. This work, however, was interrupted in 1438 which gave Domenico time to go to Perugia to paint an altarpiece for the monastery church of Santa Giuliana, which is now displayed in the Galleria Nazionale dell'Umbria. In 1437 he also took on a contract to execute an altarpiece for the monks of Saint'Agostino at Asciano. By 1439, Domenico had been paid to work in the hospital of Santa Maria della Scala (Siena).

The frescoes executed in the Pellegrinaio of the hospital between 1439 and 1440 represent scenes of the institution's history and good works; they are the artist's last finished works and are considered to be his masterpieces. For the most part, Domenico's works were based in Perugia, and his only known activity outside of Siena may have been at Florence as his first biographer, Giorgio Vasari, records works carried out by him in the Carmine and Santa Trinita. In January 1440 Domenico di Bartolo was married to Antonia Pannilini, and on 18 February 1446, Antonia Pannilini was officially mentioned as a widow.

== Early life ==
Domenico di Bartolo was born in Asciano, which was a province in Siena in the Italian region Tuscany. Domenico carried the family name Ghezzi. There is only one document that could have been associated with Domenico before 1428. As observed by Johns Hopkins art history professor Carl Strehlke, in the Opera del Duomo payments for 1420, a certain Domenico di Bartolo—otherwise unidentified—is compensated two soldi (a medieval Italian silver coin) for his work as a "gharzone di bottega". The term gharzone may define someone's position ranging from a full-fledged apprentice to a mere helper or worker. If the document indeed were to refer to Domenico, he was most likely at the beginning stages of his artistic training, and only eight years later in 1428 he finally made a standing for himself by being acknowledged in the painter's guild. On the basis of this payment document in 1420, it is most probable that Domenico was born sometime between 1400 and 1405. However, more accurate sources that record his exact date of birth have yet to be discovered today.

Carl Brendon Strehlke further elaborates that the payment documents for the Opera del Duomo show that, at the time, the Opera was overseeing several important sculptural commissions: a new pulpit for the Council of Siena, the decoration of the cathedral pavement, and most importantly the construction of a new baptismal font. It is recorded that some of the most progressive artists in all of Tuscany were involved in these projects, names which include Ghiberti, Donatello, Francesco di Valdambrino, Domenico di Niccolo' de Cori, and Jacopo della Quercia. It is therefore not a surprise that Domenico's first extant painting, the Madonna of Humility of 1433, possessed strong sculptural qualities. Art historians such as Strehlke and Bruce Cole claim that it is highly likely that during the time that Domenico worked as a Gharzone for the Opera's projects, he received many influences from many of the mentioned sculptors. Other contemporary artists that existed during Domenico di Bartolo's time were Stefano di Giovanni and Giovanni di Paolo, who were already active master painters by their early twenties. Both di Giovanni and Giovanni di Paolo placed emphasis on more of the linear and emotive qualities of drawing, whereas di Bartolo conceived of forms in rounded masses.

=== Madonna of Humility (1433) ===
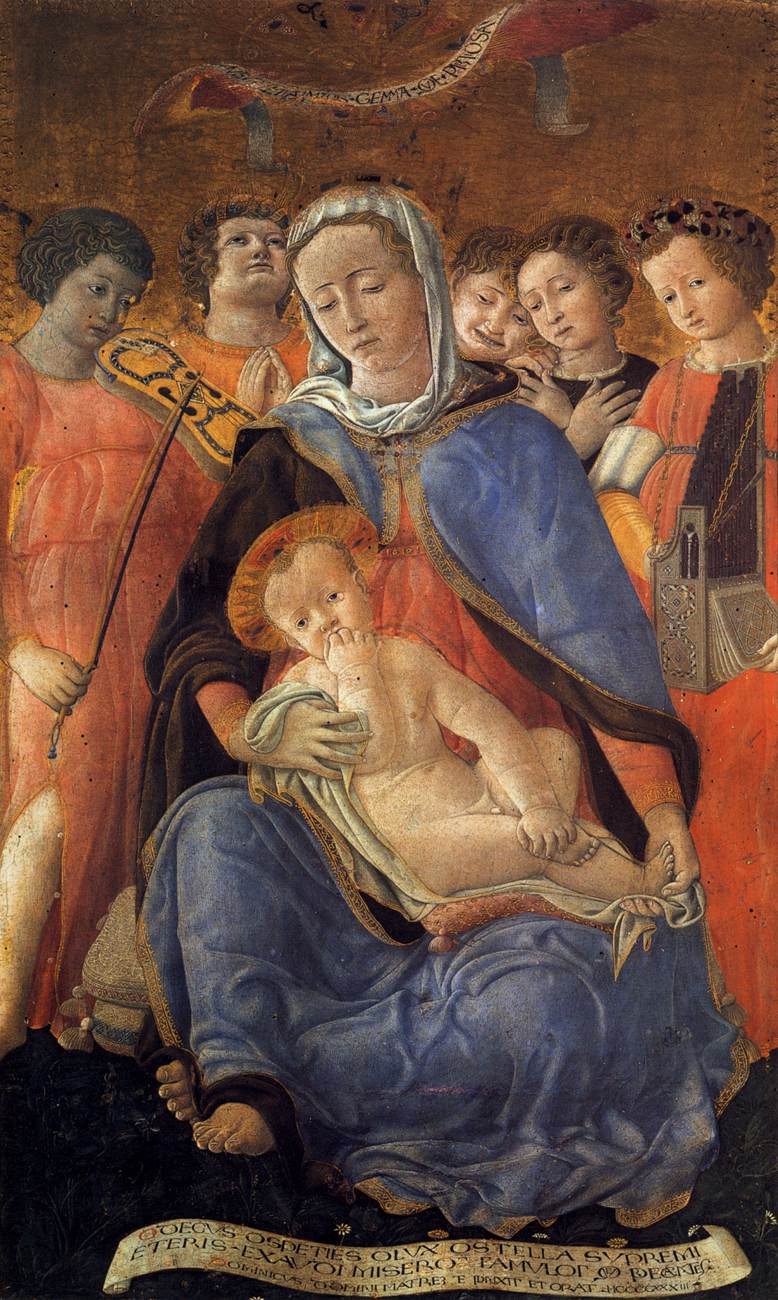
Domenico di Bartolo – Madonna of Humility

Domenico di Bartolo's Madonna of Humility of 1433 is recorded to be the artist's first-ever commissioned piece of artwork. Renaissance Scholar Bruce Cole refers to Domenico's Madonna of Humility with Angels as "one of the loveliest works of the early Sienese Quattrocento". When observed comparatively, the painting traces back to hints of Masaccio as well as the sculptor Jacopo della Quercia. Jacopo was likely to have influenced Domenico's painting more directly, for the practical reason that the two artists were in closer proximity to each other, and in addition, they had the experience of working together for the Opera of Duomo. It is hence also entirely possible that Jacopo della Quercia could have even provided some guidance in the creation of Domenico di Bartolo's work. This type of mentorship is comparable to that of Lorenzo Ghiberti in Florence, who, as stated in the Commentary, provided the same kind of assistance to the painters in that city during his time. Another situation that can attest to Jacopo and Domenico's professional relationship comes from the written record that after Jacopo was elected to be the overseeing operator of the Cathedral of Siena's works, Domenico di Bartolo secured himself works to paint in the sacristy. Scholars such as Bruce Cole commend Domenico's Madonna of Humility, because it is unlike any Sienese painting of its time. This is for several technical and stylistic reasons, all of which give insight into Domenico di Bartolo's keen eye for adaptation and observation from fellow artists. In particular, much of the art critiques give recognition to Domenico's painting because of its strong sculptural references, many of which align with Jacopo della Quercia's style.

The composition of the painting is centred with a very volumetrically and triangularly depicted Madonna. Behind her are five angels, who form a semicircle that gives further movement and depth into the painted space. Referring back to several of the Madonna panels by Masaccio that have survived until today, a similarity between them and Domenico's Madonna is that the large figures created dominating geometrical forms that give the overall image a strong sense of sculptural stability and gravity. Art historians also mention that the colour palette of the painting is of particular skill and thoughtfulness. The green, pink and blue of the Madonna's robes in contrast with the paleness of the angels' garments and the pale green of the cloth on the infant all come together to display a trait that was peculiar to the Sienese paintings that were produced around the 1400s. Such peculiarity comes from the fact that the mixing of these colours was more definitive to Florentine-styled art. Hence, colour, geometric orientation, costumes, and faces all come together to suggest that Domenico would have received his early apprentice training from someone in Siena with strong Florentine influences. Two possible candidates that Bruce Cole introduces are Paolo di Giovanni Fei or Taddeo di Bartolo.

Logistically, Taddeo would especially be a likely possibility because of his apparent Florentine styles in his art. Having this kind of mentorship would have most definitely have encouraged Domenico to observe and attempt to adapt to the latest Florentine artistic styles, techniques, trends and developments. More so than any other Sienese painter of his time, Domenico well understood Masaccio's well-recognized realistic and straightforward style of painting. In particular, he was able to incorporate Masaccio's styles into his own paintings without distorting or misrepresenting them. Domenico di Bartolo must have visited Pisa and Florence sometime in the late 1420s, where he would have witnessed paintings executed by Masaccio, who was considered by Giorgio Vasari to be one of the best painters of his time, as well as the first great Italian painter of the Quattrocento Renaissance period. Masaccio was commended for his refined skills in imitating nature, recreating lifelike movements in his subjects, as well as his consistent success in creating a convincing three-dimensionality to his paintings. Domenico's observations of Masaccio's painting would have proved to be an educational experience as he later is seen to utilize a type of artistic technique called circular-arc composition within the Madonna of Humility. The five angels are arranged in a semi-circle, creating significantly more tangible space for the presentation of the Virgin, without, however, affecting the flat picture plane caused by the isocephalic distribution of the angels' heads. This kind of semi-circular composition was used by Masaccio in works such as the Adoration of the Magi for the Pisa altarpiece. This technique was considered to be an effective way of organizing a large number of figures that exist in a complicated narrative scene, into a single simple geometric configuration.

In regards to sculptor Jacopo della Quercia, Domenico's Madonna of Humility shows hints of adaptation by displaying similarities to Jacopo's Madonna in the Fonte Gaia. Both portray a new kind of gothic flexibility in the draper, which creates soft pockets of shadows that add a new kind of weightiness to the figure and to the overall image. Domenico's Madonna of Humility eventually ended up contributing significantly more to Florentine than to Sienese art. During the time that the painting was released to the public, appreciation and recognition from Sienese art critics were minimal. To serve as evidence that there had been some kind of a partnership to exist between Jacopo and Domenico, John Pope-Hennessy's research confirms that the major works of Domenico for the Cathedral of Siena were commissioned at the time when Jacopo was the overseeing operational director of the Opera del Duomo. When Jacopo Quercia left Siena in 1435, he had selected two counsellors to proceed with his job. Domenico was one of the two witnesses to approve of Jacopo's nomination decisions.

In the painting, the Virgin is also depicted in a way that had been popularized in Siena by Gentile da Fabriano: an Italian painter who was best known for his international gothic painting style. Other artists who depicted the Virgin in a similar manner during this time were Giovanni di Paolo for his Branchini Madonna of 1427 and Andrea di Bartolo for his Madonna of Humility. Yet, there are several artistic elements within Domenico's Madonna of Humility that derive from techniques frequently observed in Florentine works. The frontal view of The Virgin, who is presented in an asymmetric composition, is said to have been inspired by Masaccio's Madonna of Humility. Foreshortened halos and Virgin's crown were rare during the time that Domenico di Bartolo's painting was executed, and can only be found in the Pisa altarpiece executed by Masaccio. There, too, is an illustration of the baby with fingers in his mouth, which strongly recalls back to Masaccio's Pisa altarpiece, which illustrates the Christ child eating grapes. Domenico's Madonna of Humility successfully models lights and darks within the flesh tones, and this too is done in the style of Masaccio. However, renowned British art historian John Pope-Hennessy states in his articles that Domenico di Bartolo cannot be a fully Masacciesque painter. Whilst painters like Filippo Lippi or Andrea di Giusto depict their figures to stand up in a stiff manner, those of Domenico di Bartolo possess a certain "Gothic flexibility". Hennessy observes a certain fluid quality in Bartolo's paintings. For example, the Madonna's knee is bent and the angels to the left of the Madonna have curved bodies. As a result, it is infinitely more likely that Domenico drew stronger influences for the painting's details from Jacopo della Quercia.

Domenico di Bartolo was praised for capitalizing on Florentine elements, and was considered an incredibly talented Sienese painter because of how early on in his career he had managed to adopt the Florentine Renaissance style. Giorgio Vasari notes that sometime in his career, Domenico di Bartolo painted altarpieces for Florentine churches, which confirms such appraisals and evaluations that Domenico was competent enough to analyze and infer from the Florence aspects of Renaissance art. Yet, many Sienese and general Renaissance art critics consider Domenico to still be a Sienese painter, with acquired Florentine tastes, and not a progressive Florentine painter. His work of the Madonna of Humility is ultimately considered Sienese, and many art historians conclude that at this time Domenico himself was a young artist who was attracted and eagerly open to new ideas, but perhaps had not yet assimilated such ideas to a profound meaning.

The Theology that seems to have influenced the Madonna of Humility aligns with preacher and proclaimed saint Bernardino Albizzeschi, otherwise referred to as Bernardino da Siena (1380–1444, canonized 1450 ). Albizzeschi is considered to be one of the major religious and political figures to have shaped the outcomes of Domenico di Bartolo's artworks and to have influenced the overall success of Domenico as an artist. During his time, Bernardino Albizzeschi was considered to be one of the most followed, loved and vilified men in Italy. He himself was not unfamiliar with the art world during his time, and was known to favour canonized artistic images from the Sienese Trecento, and therefore influenced the subsequent production of many Sienese artworks. In Domenico's Madonna of Humility, the common salutation on the painting – "Ave Maria"- is replaced by the term "Ave Stella Maris", which means "Hail Star of the Sea". Although this ancient attribute originated early on in Christian etymology for the name Mary, there is no existing record of an author before Bernardino who had written so intricately about the term's meaning.

In regards to who actually commissioned Domenico di Bartolo's first work, the answer remains entirely ambiguous. However, researcher Carl Strehlke observes and concludes that two likely candidates to consider in this aspect are Casini and Bartoli, both of whom were Bishops of Siena from 1408 and 1427 respectively. Both Casini and Bartoli were close to Bernardino da Siena, and back then Bartoli was the rector of the Hospital of Santa Maria della Scala from 1410 to 1427. Bernardino promotes Bartoli's position to a Bishop as a means to draw closer the relationship between the city's church and the hospital Santa Maria della Scala (Siena).

=== The Sigismund Plaque (1434) ===
In 1434, Domenico also conceived and designed a fresco panel with the representation of Emperor Sigismund Enthroned (Sigismund, Holy Roman Emperor) for the Siena Cathedral, however the specific date of completion remains unknown. Art critic and historian Cesare Brandi has praised Domenico's fresco panel in his writings because of its Florentine qualities. Similar to Domenico's Madonna of Humility, which was completed less than a year before the commission of the panel had begun to take form. The plaque of Emperor Sigismund is drawn with a simple semi-circle composition. Brandi comments of the architecture of the fresco panel, for although it is not entirely correct in perspective, it can be successfully viewed from below. Carl Strehlke comments on the image of the Emperor as a hierarchal presentation of Emperor Sigismund's court because he, like a Saint or Madonna, is depicted with significantly greater height in comparison to the other figures in the art piece. Domenico also utilizes symmetry principles for the fresco's composition- as observed, the man with the hat on the left is mirrored by another on the right. There are aspects of this fresco panel that can be seen again in Domenico's later on works, such as the fresco of the Papal Grant of Privileges to the Hospital in the Santa Maria della Scala (Siena).

== Adult career ==
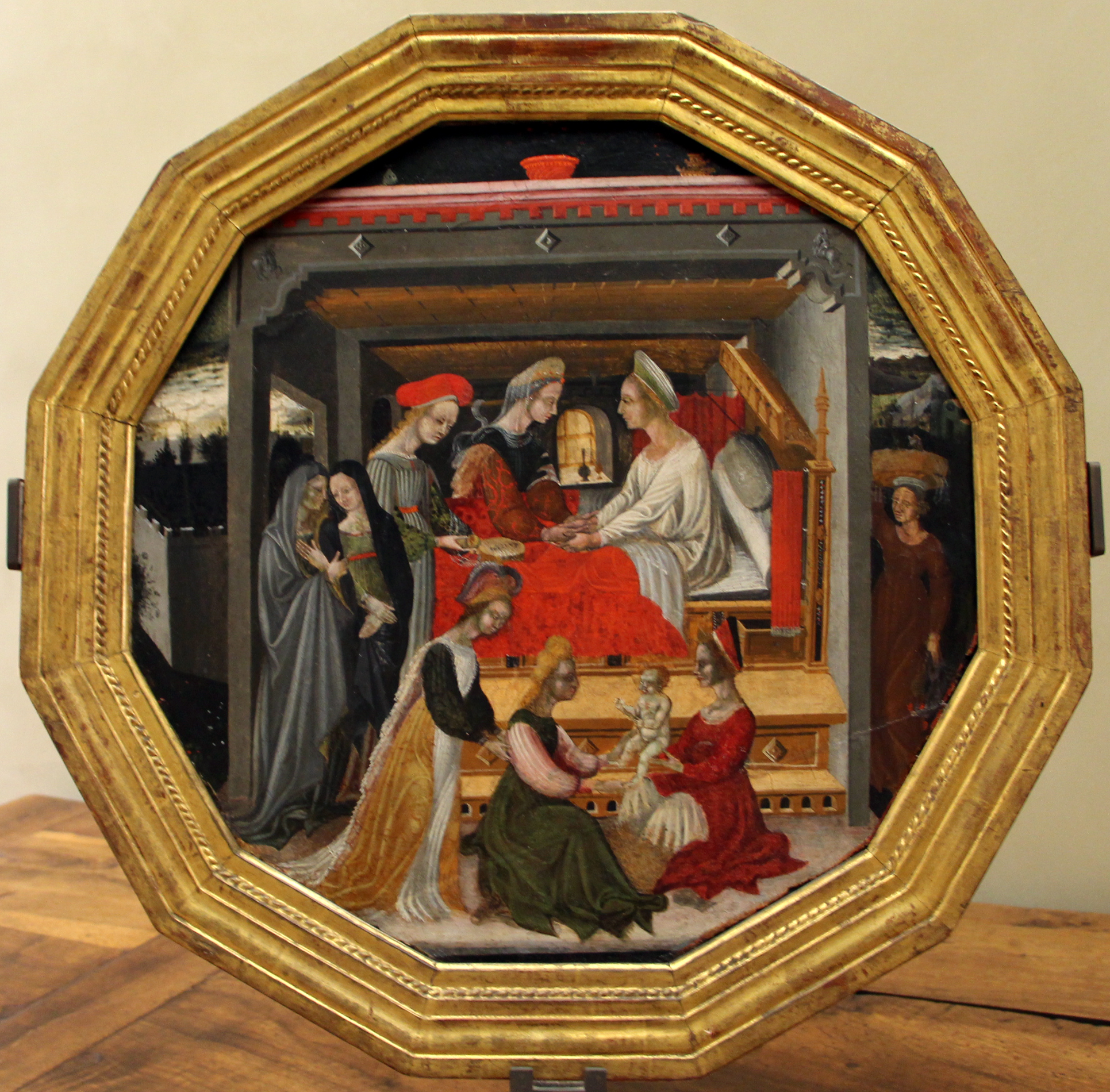
Desco da parto with the birth of John the Baptist, 1420-40.

From the works completed by Domenico in the later part of his thirties, only three paintings from these years have managed to survive. First, a Perugia altarpiece for Santa Giuliana. Second, a signed and dated Madonna and Child in the Johnson Collection, and finally, a small Madonna del Refugio in Siena. Domenico also frescoed the walls of the sacristy in Siena Cathedral, however a very tiny fragment of them has managed to survive until today. Researcher Carl Strehlke mentions in his dissertations that such frescoes in the cathedral were in such a poor state of maintenance that their subjects and story could not be identified. It is said that Domenico produced an average of one fresco per year, in which he seems to have produced little other work during this time. For these frescoes, however, Domenico seemed to turn away from his Florentine influences and interests, as he began to reflect more traditional Gothic styles. This is especially apparently for an altarpiece painted in 1438 for St. Giuliana, Perugia. From 1440 to 1444, Domenico produced one of his most significant works, another masterpiece, which were a series of frescoes for the pilgrims' hotel in the Ospedale di Santa Maria della Scala (Siena). The frescoes were said to have been commissioned by Giovanni Buzzichelli, who was the hotel's rector. The frescoes illustrate daily life as well as the history of the Sienese hospital. Domenico was assigned five scenes: three with everyday life episodes and the other two with events that have occurred from the history of the hospital.

=== Siena Cathedral Sacristy Frescoes ===
Whilst Domenico is best known for his frescoes for the Santa Maria della Scala Hospital in Siena, the Sacristy frescoes he had completed for the Siena Cathedral played an integral part in establishing Domenico's name as a rising fresco painter in Siena. Domenico began to work on the sacristy frescoes one month after his mentor sculptor Jacopo della Quercia was named the operational director of the cathedral's artistic restoration project. As mentioned previously, it is clear that some form of a partnership had existed prior to Jacopo della Quercia's election, because of the efficient timing in which Domenico had been summoned to complete artworks for the cathedral. However, Domenico was only able to produce for the cathedral one fresco a year, for Strehlke and other researchers observe that Domenico must have been occupied with other commissioned works. Almost none of these frescoes in the cathedral have been able to survive until today.

=== Madonna and Child Enthroned (1437) ===
In 1437, four years after the Madonna of Humility, Domenico di Bartolo painted a Madonna and Child. Giorgio Vasari identifies the panel painting "Madonna and Child Enthroned" as a fragment of an altarpiece for the high altar of the Santa Maria del Carmine, Florence e. As observed by art historian Carl Strehlke, the pointed shortening of the upper edges and the low viewpoint of the Virgin's abdomen are all indications that the painting's composition had originally possessed different dimensions. The sides of the panel seem to have been planed and the lower edge cut. It remains unknown exactly where Domenico was residing during the time that he was painting this piece. Three possible locations are Siena, Florence or Perugia, for there are no documents that record commissions Domenico had received outside of these three mentioned locations.

Scholar Bruce Cole observes that the two largely depicted figures, the Madonna and the child, seem to have the same "awkward but compelling force" that one can spot in Masaccio's paintings. Straying away from the more popular and predominant characteristics in Sienese paintings, Domenico's painting of the Madonna and Child carefully avoids any elegant expressions of beauty; instead, the two individuals are depicted to be unsophisticated and modest. There is a stark emotional contrast in facial expressions between the child and his apprehensive mother. Some possible sources of inspiration for this painting could have been the works of Ambrogio Lorenzetti, for similarities in the tender and fearful body gesture of the mother, along with the protecting and intertwining with the baby is evident. In addition, Madonna's spread-out right hand in Domenico's painting can be traced present to several of the hands featured in Ambrogio's paintings.

=== Santa Maria della Scala (1439–1444) ===
Between 1439 and 1444, Domenico di Bartolo participated in the decoration of the Pilgrim's hall in the Hospital of Santa Maria della Scala, Siena, where he followed the artistic styles of artist Lorenzo Vecchietta and consequently produced six frescoes, all of which were signed by Domenico himself. As a result, this five-year commission from the hospital became a huge proportion of Domenico's mid-thirties artistic career. Whilst six frescoes can be identified as executed by Domenico, little decorative works of the hospital have managed to survive until today. Much of these frescoes (including ones done by other Sienese artists) are in extremely poor condition, in which the subjects and contents of the frescoes are sometimes impossible to identify. Vecchietta introduced to the art world of Siena a kind of naturalistic style that Domenico soon followed, however, Domenico's paintings in the hospital still demonstrated a slightly more Gothic style and approach. His interdisciplinary style, which quotes major Florentine artists, an on-the-rise Sienese painter, and his own Gothic elements, show a deep awareness for a kind of new artistic language of the Renaissance period.

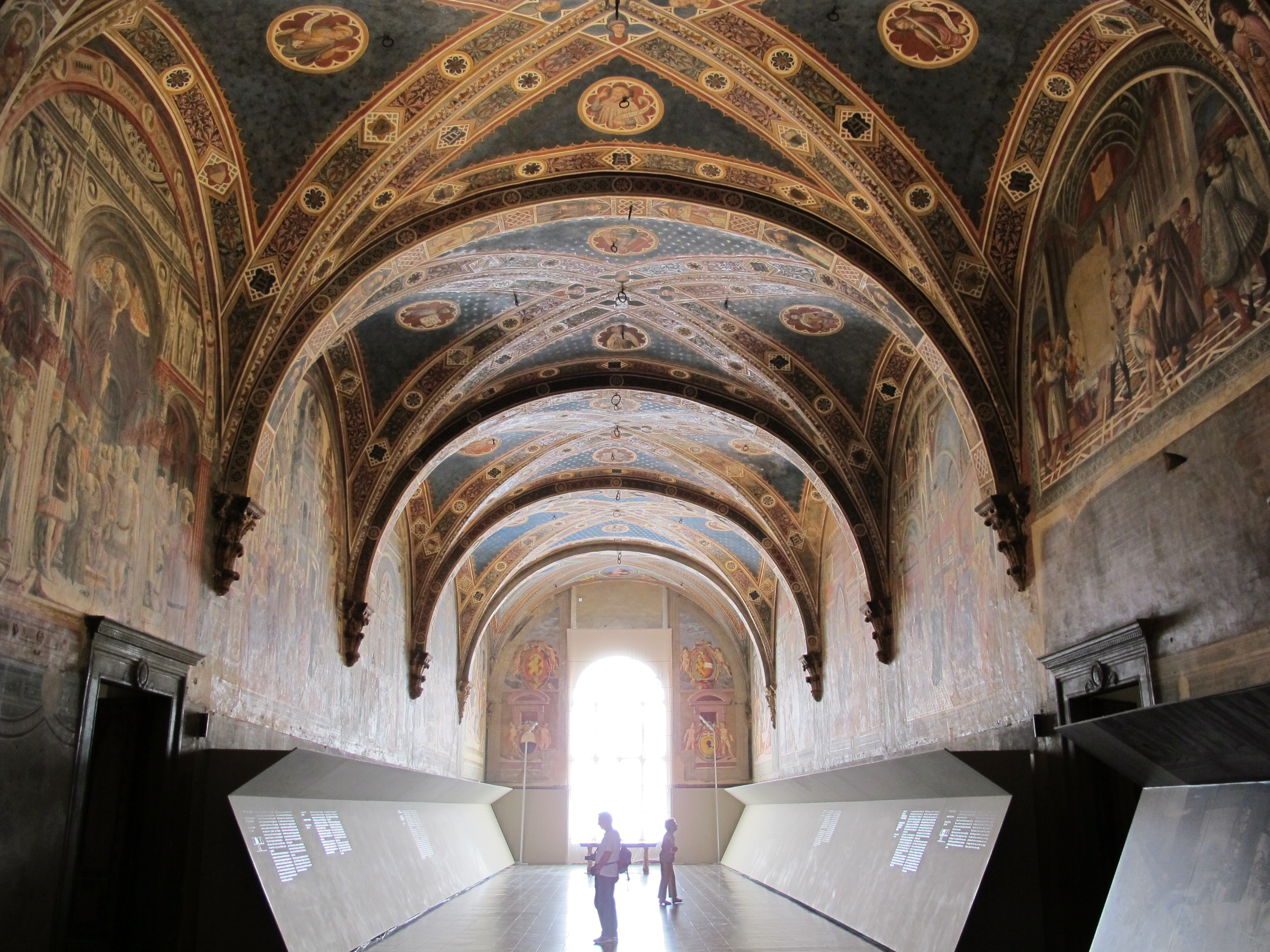
Il pellegrinaio

Santa Maria della Scala, Siena was one of Europe's first hospitals, and whilst it is now a museum on display, it is still one of the oldest hospital buildings surviving today. The hospital is conveniently located across both the Siena Cathedral and the Opera del Duomo, where Domenico also completed commissioned works around the same time. The hospital was also, at one point in time, one of the wealthiest and most powerful institutions in Siena. The hospital's significance extended beyond serving as the central ward for the city and its surrounding territories. It also functioned as a charitable institution. The hospital was facilitated by a wide and diverse range of committees that were considered prominent citizens. In particular, the committee included main artists who employed their own group of painters and sculptors to help decorate the wards and the church within the building. Some of the earlier contributors to the hospital from the Trecento period include Ambrogio Lorenzetti and Pietro Lorenzetti. The hospital became the ultimate destination to host meaningful Sienese art. During the time that Domenico di Bartolo was employed to paint sections of the hospital, the primary artist in charge of decorating the interior frescoes was Bartolomeo Bulgarini. Each fresco that was to be produced would display some kind of attribution to the hospital's philanthropic work. Domenico was but a minor artist to contribute to the artistic works within the building. The six frescoes he did produce, however, were acknowledged by many art historians to be unique and incorporative of Gothic styles. Consequently, one could never mistake Domenico's frescoes to be executed by a Florentine. During this time, Domenico began to display greater interest in his own native art, and many of the paintings were carried out with strong Sienese elements.

The frescoes that Domenico produced were located on the walls of the Pellegrinaio di Santa Maria della Scala, which served as a ward for sick patients at the time. Pellegrinaio is alternatively referred to as the Pilgrim's Hall, and the art that decorates the hall's interiors serves to represent a strong proof of artistic development over the progressive years since the hospital had first been built in 1268. The project to decorate the Pilgrim's hall was first proposed by Giovanni di Francesco Buzzichelli (1434–1444). Giovanni is the one who summoned both Vecchietta and Domenico di Bartolo to carry out the project. Both of them successfully renovated the hall in a way that depicts the realities of lively daily existence. As mentioned by Strehlke, no documentation of a commission for this hospital wall is known to exist. He also observes that although the frescoes done by Domenico di Bartolo (as well as Vecchietta) that have managed to survive until today present a unified pictorial scene, details such as changes in the framing and challenges with the architecture of the hospital show that adaptations were made during the execution of the artworks. It is unclear what position Domenico occupied in the hospital's decoration, and there are no records that he served at the planner or director of the project.

==== Care of The Sick ====
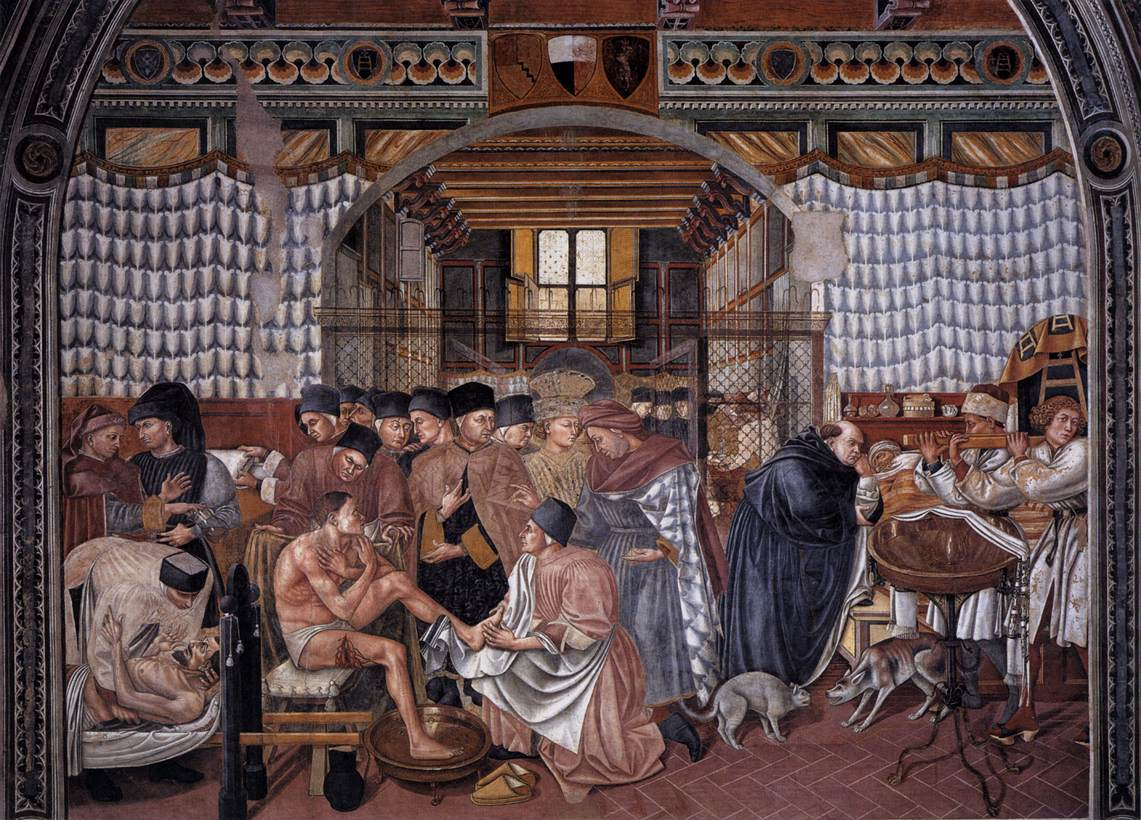
Domenico di Bartolo – Care of the Sick

Domenico's first of his six frescoes is named the "Care of The Sick", which is signed by Domenico with Latin inscription and dated to 1440. The fresco shows, with impressive detail, the interior layout of the hospital ward. Doctors and nurses are depicted assisting the patients, as well as carrying out other generous deeds. The fresco also depicts in the centre foreground the washing of the patient's feet, directly inferring to the well-known image of Christ washing the feet of his disciples. Throughout the whole painting, Domenico vividly brings out the colour of the costume and its well-crafted décor. Because of such imitation of a real location, Domenico is said to have followed the works of Vecchietta, where both artists pave the way into a whole new area of descriptive realism to the world of Sienese art. Other painters at the time such as Gentile da Fabriano and Pisanello might have depicted landscapes to be realistic or naturalistic, but they were consistently known to create images that came out of fantasy and creativity. It was therefore new to the art world for both Domenico and Vecchietta to produce images that seem to imitate a specific location. The frescoes by Domenico are also one of the first works done in Sienese art that includes visual clues for its viewers.

==== Education and Betrothal of the Foundlings ====
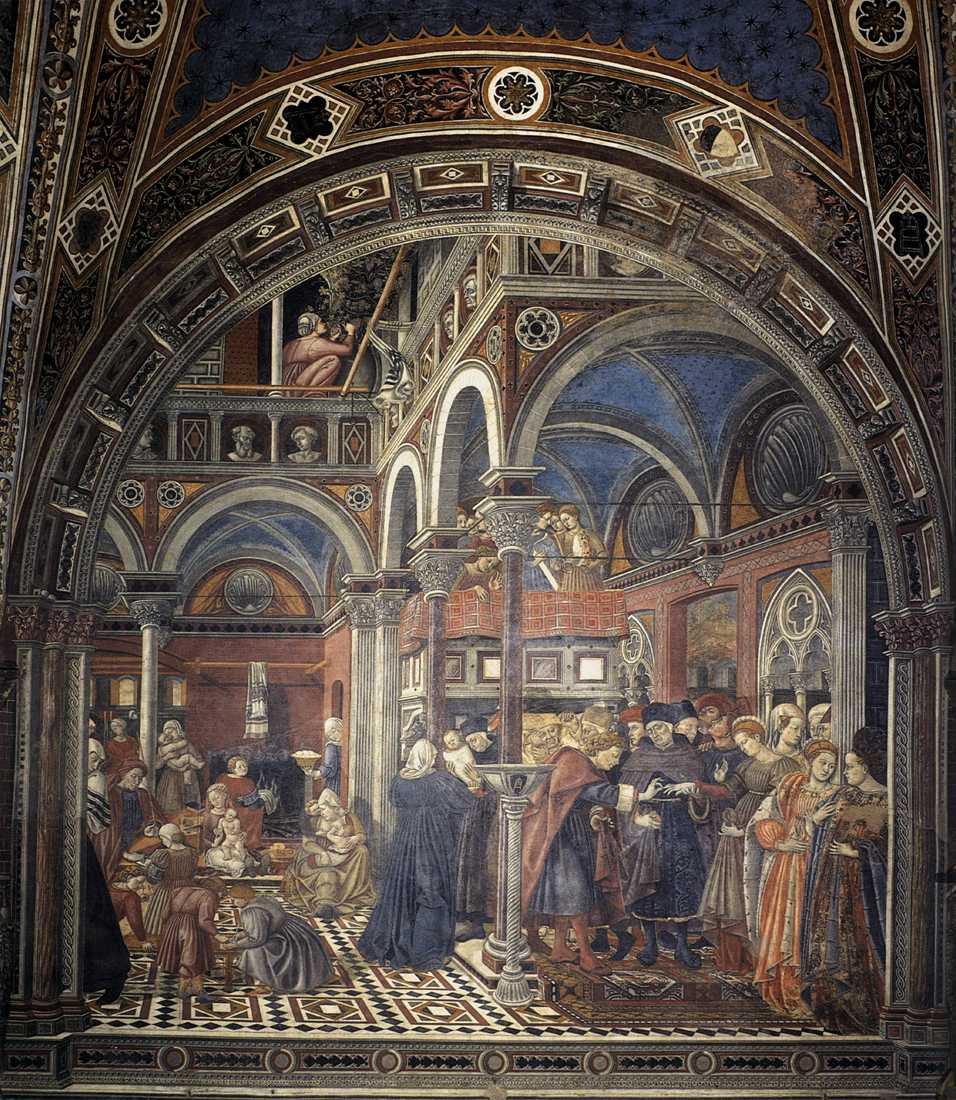
Domenico di Bartolo – Education and Betrothal of the Foundlings

The second most recognized fresco produced by Domenico was named Education and Betrothal of the Foundlings. The entire basis of which the painting is orientated upon depends almost entirely on the architectural formation. The painting depicts foundlings being betrothed under a detailed, elaborate building with grand arches. Because of the dominating architectural layout, the figures within the fresco are all formed and placed to be in a mathematically accurate spatial construction, in which all of the orthogonals join together at the single "vanishing" point on the painting's horizon. What makes this fresco peculiar for its time is its measurable, mathematically expressed space, which is a quality that was rarely produced in Sienese painting during the first half of the Quattrocento. Without a doubt, Domenico's decision to depict one of his frescos with such measured accuracy must have been influenced by realists of Florentine painting such as Masaccio, Masolino da Panicale and Filippo Lippi. Still, Bruce Cole writes about this fresco as one that stays eccentric and stylistically distant to Domenico's Sienese ancestors and Florentine contemporaries. Cole writes that the fresco is a "peculiar blend of realism and fantasy, of immediacy and distance". Because of this, the overall effect of the picture counteracts its realistic layout. Some of the most minute details in the Education and Betrothal of the Foundlings can be found in the floor tiles, rugs, decorated robes and floor-to-ceiling mouldings.

=== The last fresco ===
Domenico was unable to finish all six frescoes in time. Domenico began to have complications in his relationship with the hospital after he was unable to deliver a completed sixth fresco. In addition to this, the hospital had also commissioned Domenico to produce a Madonna della Misericordia, which he was also unable to finish. Strehlke presents documents that prove that Domenico was put on probation and his payroll was reduced. Strehlke suggests that a strong reason for Domenico being unable to finish his work was due to illness, of which he died shortly after falling sick.

== Final years ==
Di Bartolo's last ever (dated) commission was the fresco of the Coronation of the Virgin in the Cancelleria di Biccherna, for the Palazzo Pubblico of Siena. He began to paint four angel heads, but his work was interrupted by his death in 1445. Soon after, the fresco was completed by another Sienese artist Sano di Pietro.
