= Giacomo di Ser Michele =

Italian painter

Giacomo di Ser Michele (active early 15th century) was an Italian painter of the Quattrocento, active in Umbria.

He is documented painting in Città di Castello along with Giorgio of Siena, the son of Andrea di Bartolo.
