= Gregorio di Cecco =

Italian painter

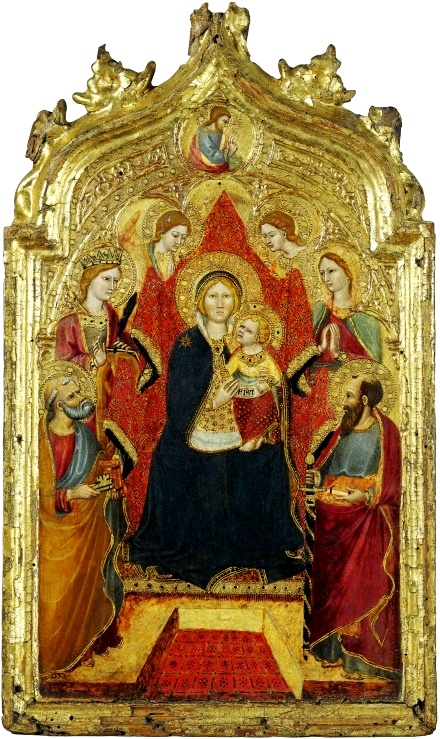
Enthroned Madonna by di Cecco now at the Liechtenstein Museum

Gregorio di Cecco (sometimes Gregorio di Cecco da Lucca or Gregorio da Lucca di Cecco) was an Italian painter of the Sienese School during the early Renaissance. He was born in Siena around 1390 and died after 1424.

In 1402, he registered with the Sienese painters' guild. Records exist of him being commissioned in 1418 to paint a Biccherna panel. In 1421, Cecco was a member of the commission who oversaw the construction of the San Paolo church in Siena.

He was a student of Taddeo di Bartolo and later became di Bartolo's partner.

== Works ==
- Madonna of Humility (1423) at the Francesco Tolomei chapel at the Siena Cathedral
- Madonna enthroned with angels and saints (date unknown) held by Gartenpalais Liechtenstein
