= Bartolo di Fredi =

Italian painter

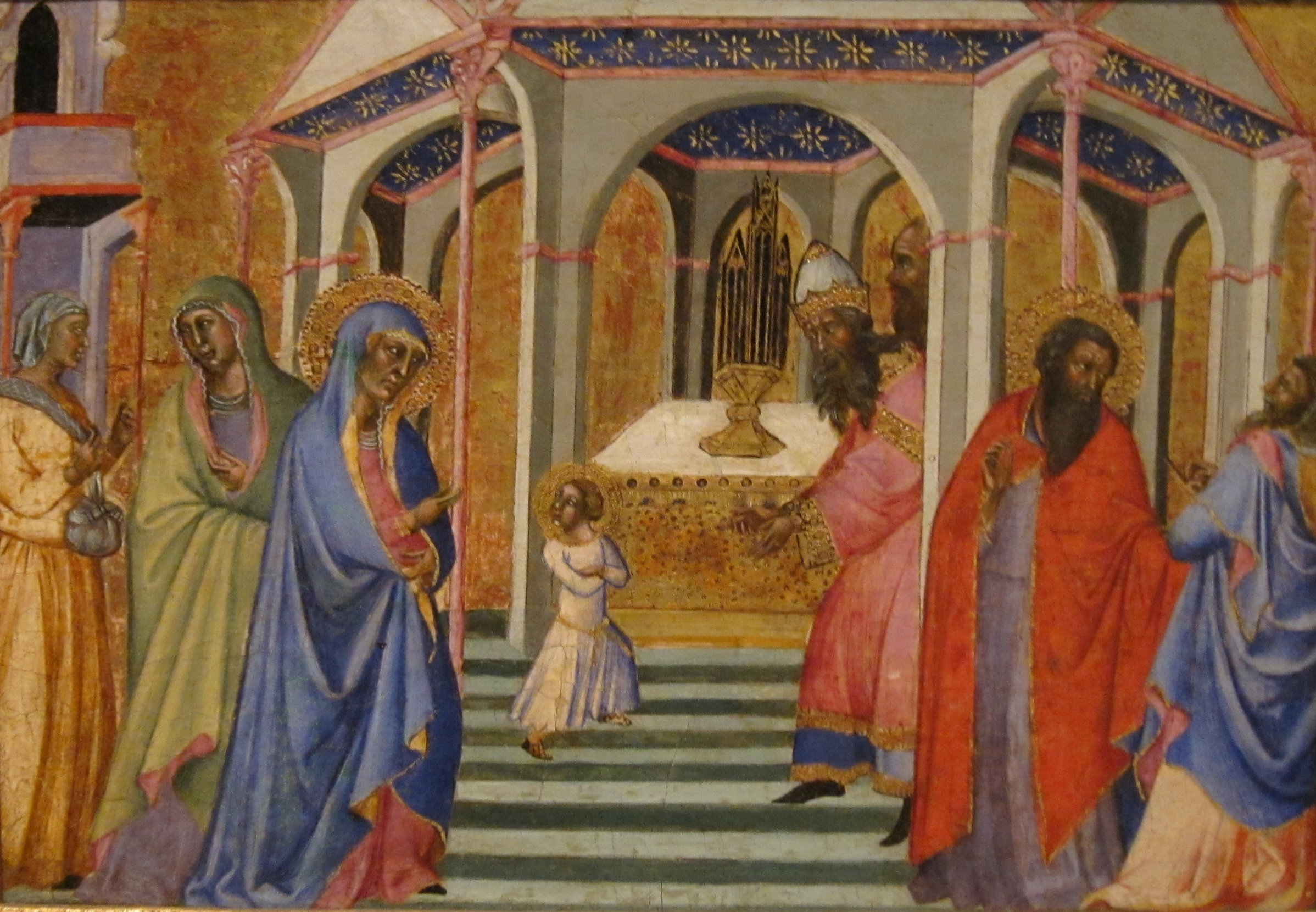
Presentation of Mary in the Temple, tempera and gold on wood by Bartolo di Fredi, c. 1360, Honolulu Museum of Art.

Bartolo di Fredi (c. 1330 – 26 January 1410), also called Bartolo Battiloro, was an Italian painter, born in Siena, classified as a member of the Sienese School.

== Biography ==
He had a large studio and was one of the most influential painters working in Siena and the surrounding towns in the second half of the fourteenth century. He registered in the Guild of that city in 1355. He had several children, who all predeceased him, with the exception of Andrea di Bartolo.

He was the companion of Andrea Vanni from 1353, and helped decorate the Hall of Council at Siena, in 1361. From 1356 he worked in the Collegiata, the principal church of San Gimignano, some 30 km from Siena, where he painted the entire side of the left aisle with a cycle of frescoes of Scenes from the Old Testament; the completed work was signed and dated in 1367. In 1366 the Council of the city of Gimignano ordered a painting, representing Two Monks of the Augustine Order to be placed in the Palazzo Pubblico, in order to commemorate the settlement of a number of long-standing disputes between their order and the city.

In the early part of 1367 he was employed, along with Giacomo di Mino, in the decoration of the Cathedral of Siena. In 1372 he rose to a position in the government of the city, and was sent to welcome the new Podestà on his approach to Siena. In 1381 he was himself made a member of the Council.

In 1382 he executed the Descent from the Cross now in the Sacristy of San Francesco, Montalcino. The same church also possesses panels painted by him containing the Baptism of Christ, figures of SS. Peter, Paul, and Francis, and five scenes from the Life of St Philip of Montalcino. In 1389, Bartolo, assisted by Luca Thome, painted the altarpiece for the Shoemakers' Company, in the Cathedral of Siena, and continued from that year until his death to furnish altarpieces for the cathedral and other churches of Siena, all of which have now disappeared.

In 1410 Bartolo was buried in the cloister of the convent of San Domenico in Siena.

As to style, Bartolo's work is marked by the rejection of the concrete figures associated with Pietro Lorenzetti to instead favor flatter, decorative otherworldly compositions in the manner of Simone Martini and Duccio. He combined a spirit of fantasy with anecdotal details.

== Public Collections ==
The Museo Civico e Diocesano d'Arte Sacra of Montalcino, the church of San Francesco, Lucignano, the Louvre, the Musée des beaux-arts de Chambéry, the Musée du Petit Palais, Avignon, the National Museum of Serbia, the Metropolitan Museum of Art, the Honolulu Museum of Art, the Los Angeles County Museum of Art, the Museum of Fine Arts, Boston and the Fralin Museum of Art of Charlottesville, Virginia, are among the public collections whose holdings include paintings by Bartolo di Fredi.

== Gallery ==
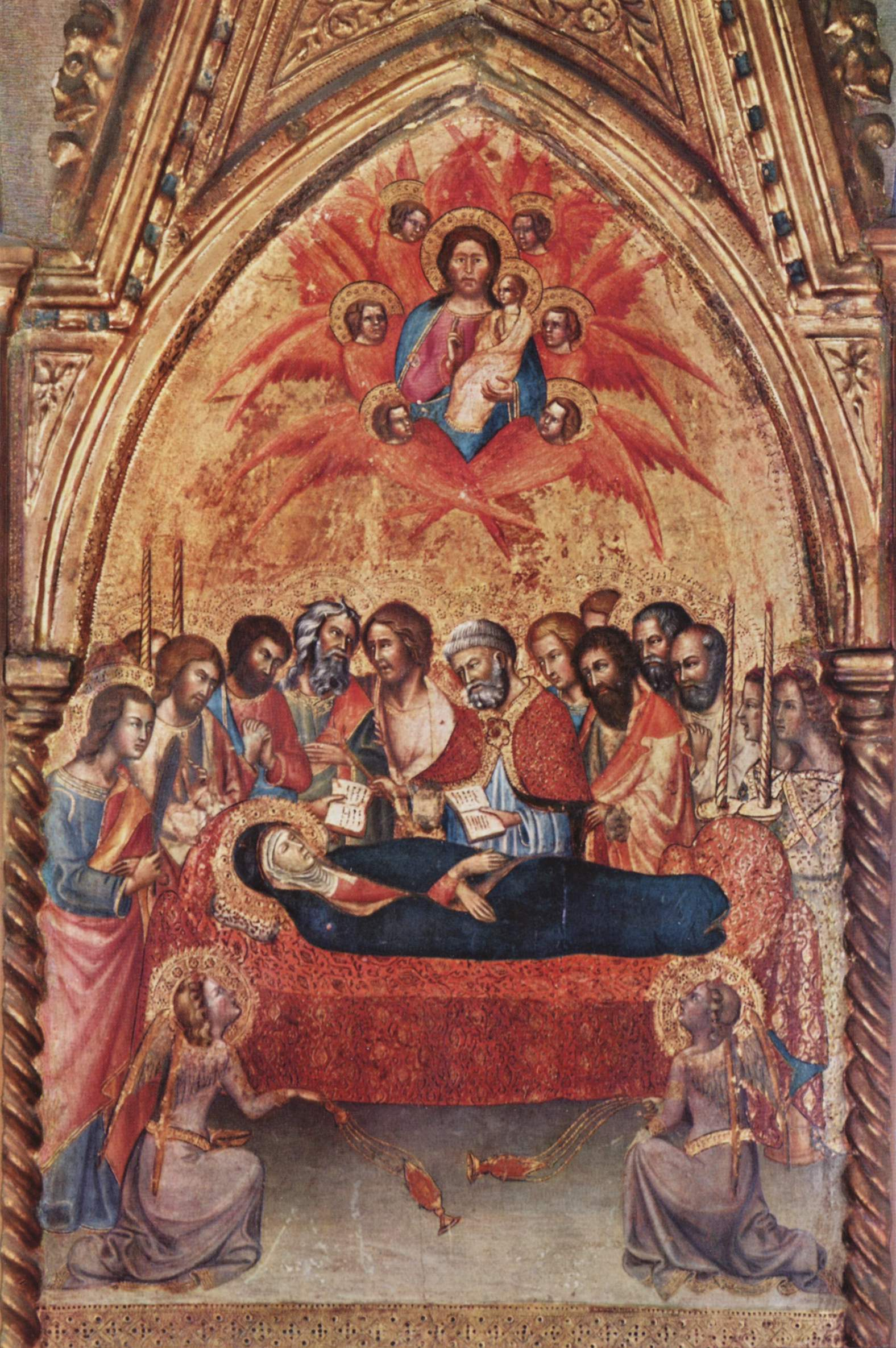
Detail from the triptych The Coronation of the Virgin (1388), tempera on panel, Museo Civico e Diocesano d'Arte Sacra, Montalcino

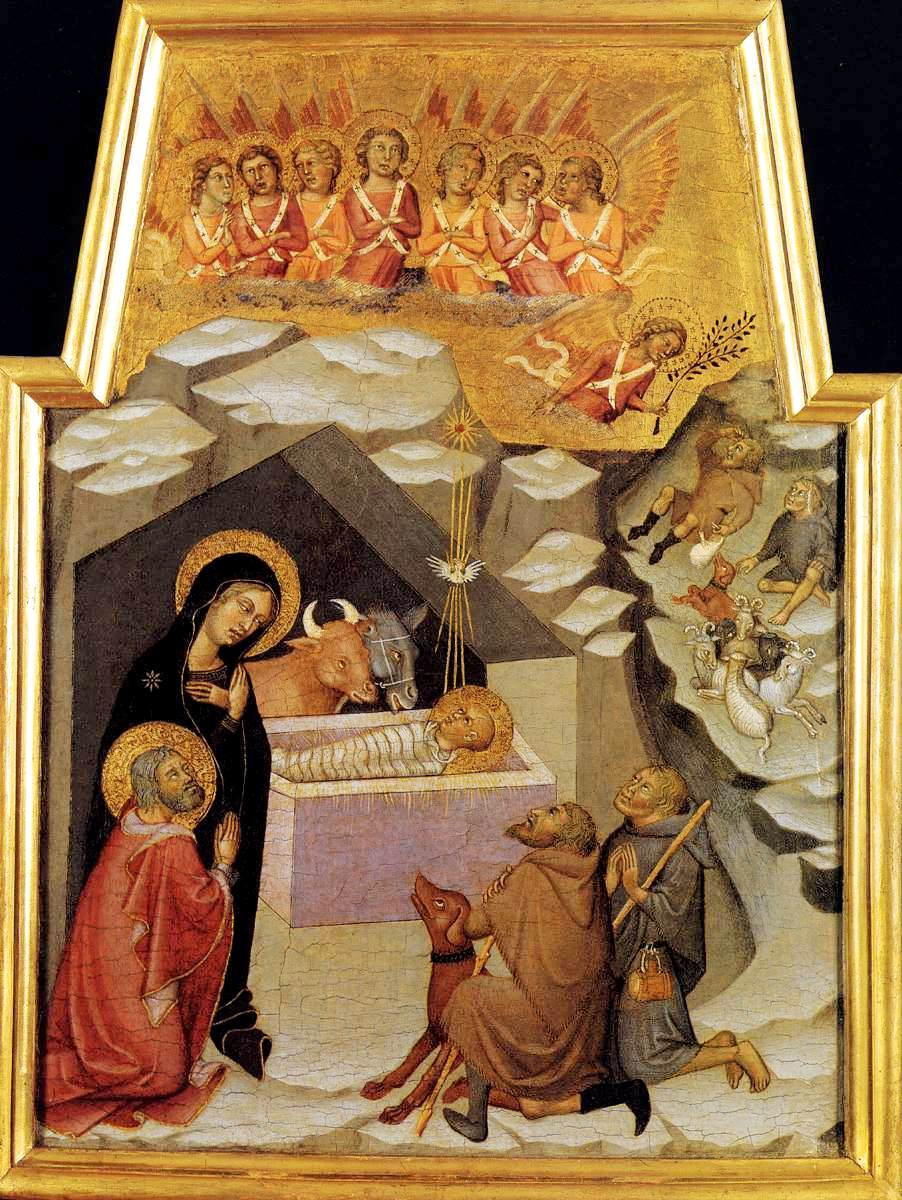
Nativity and Adoration of Shepherds (1383), tempera on panel

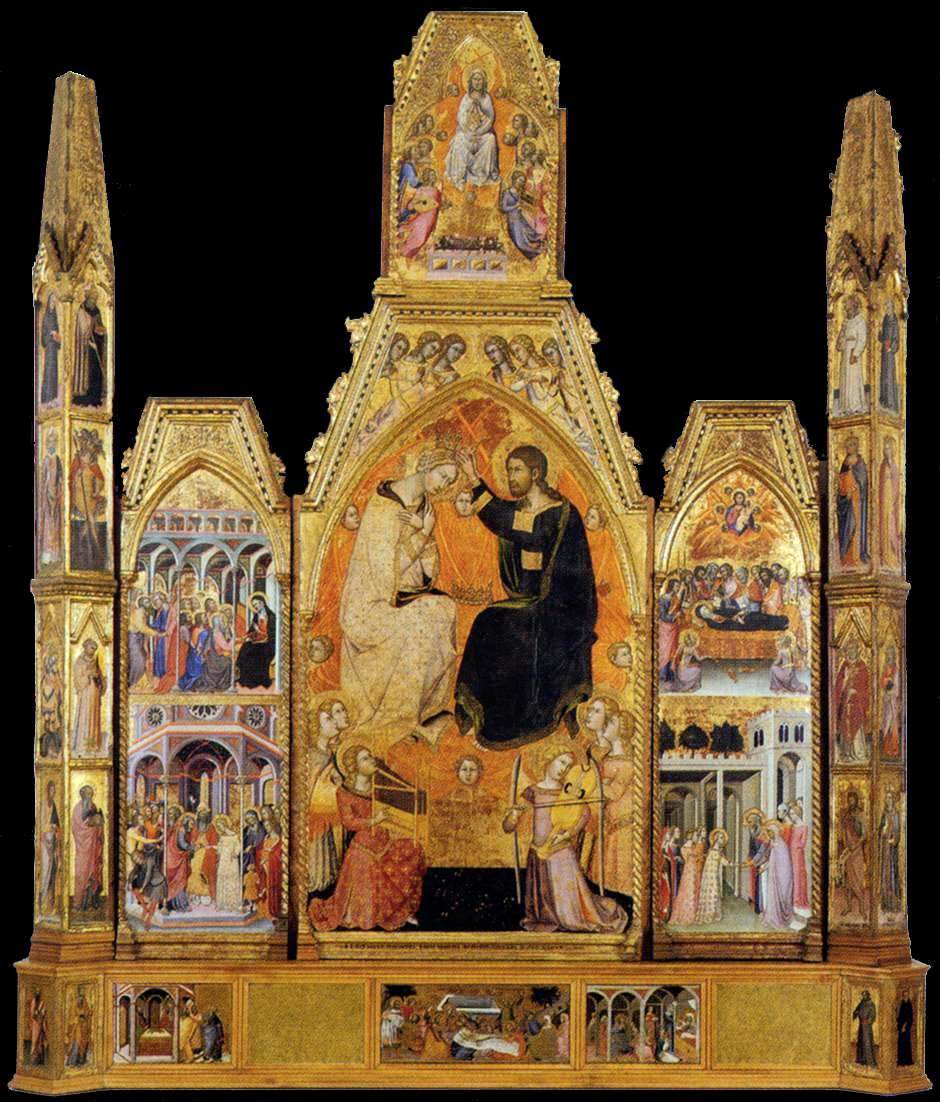
Coronation of the Virgin (1388), tempera on panel, Museo Civico e Diocesano d'Arte Sacra, Montalcino

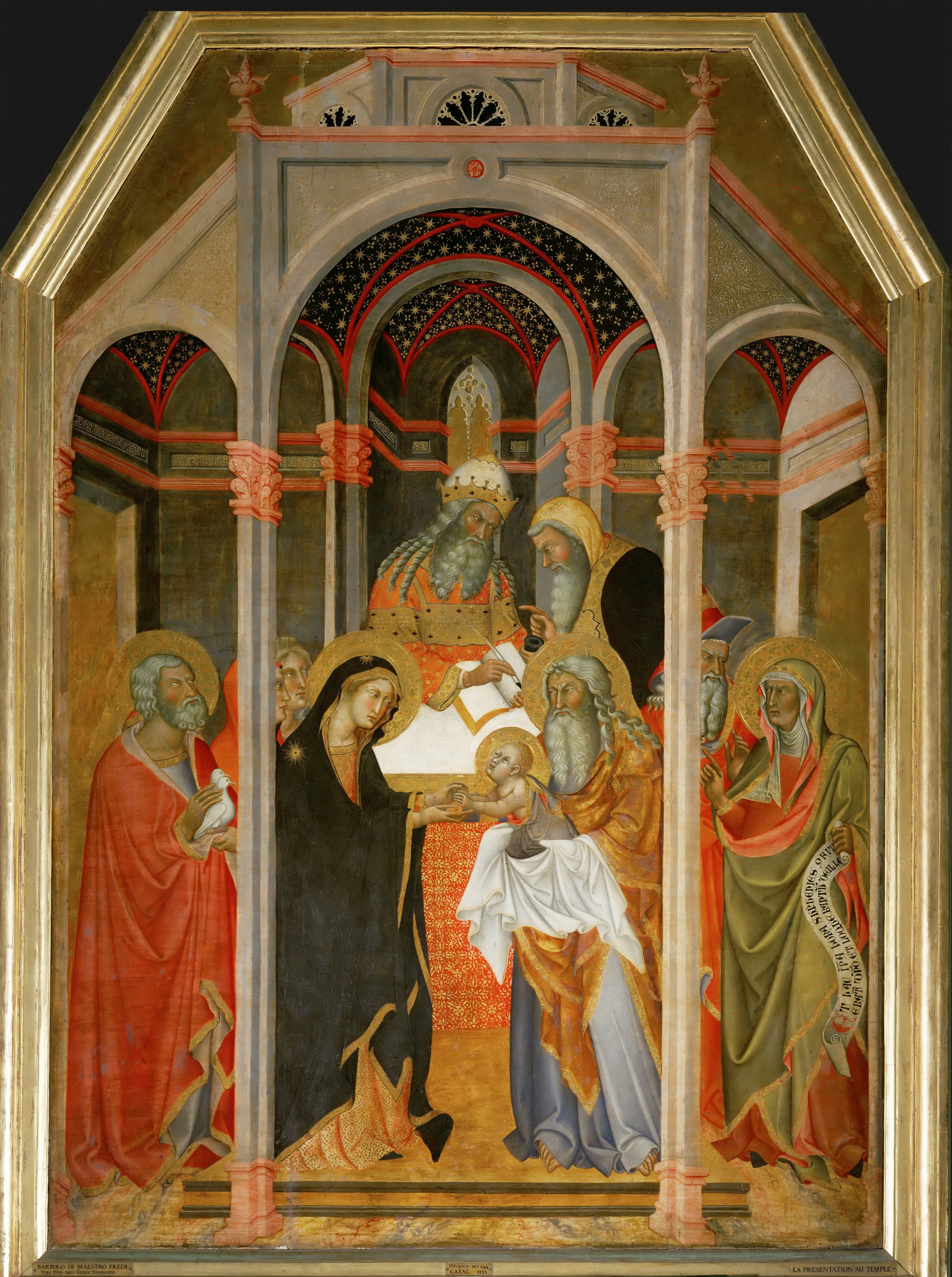
Presentation in the Temple (1388), tempera on panel, The Louvre, Paris

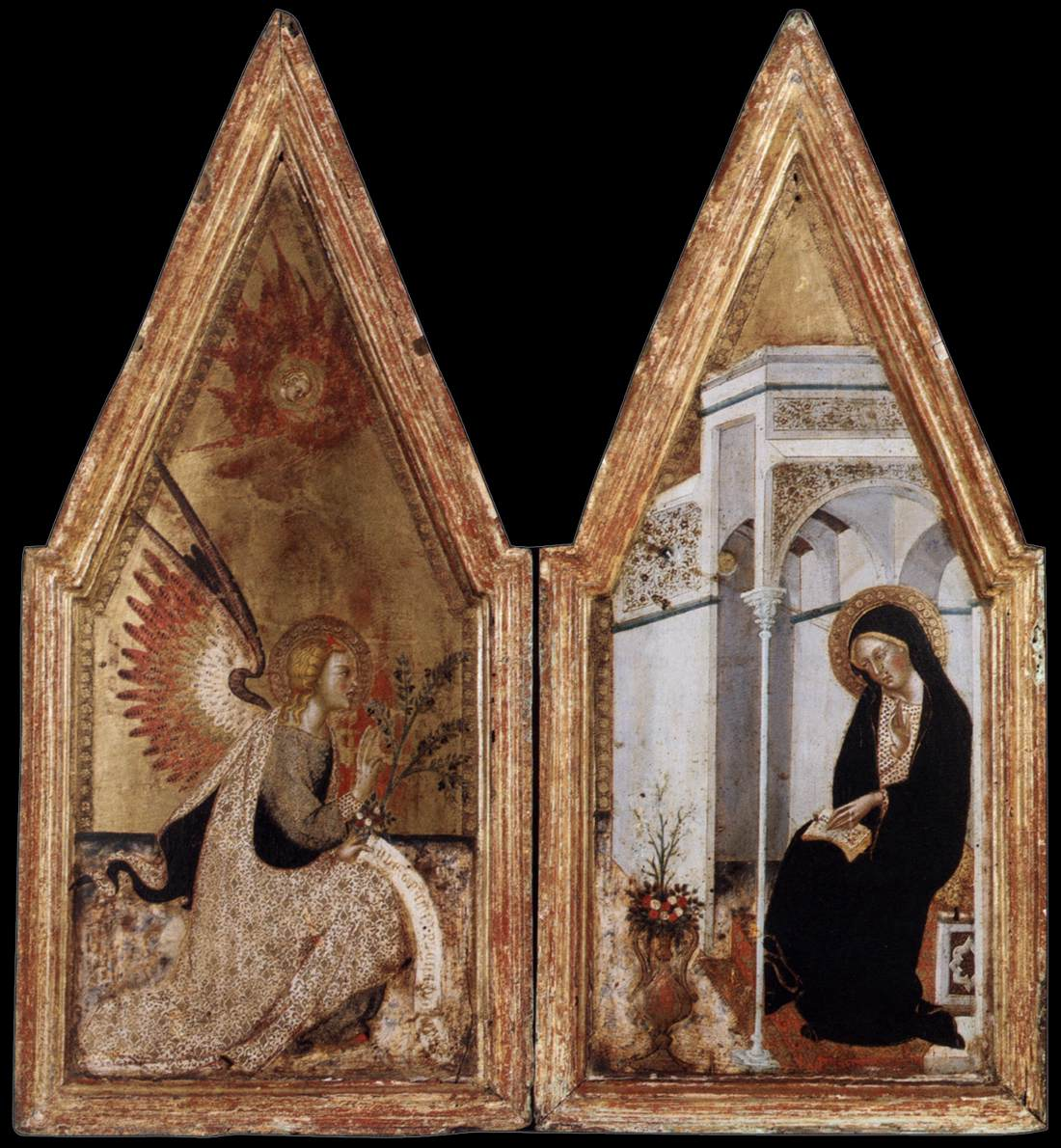
The Annunciation
(c. 1383), tempera on panel, Museum of Fine Art, Budapest

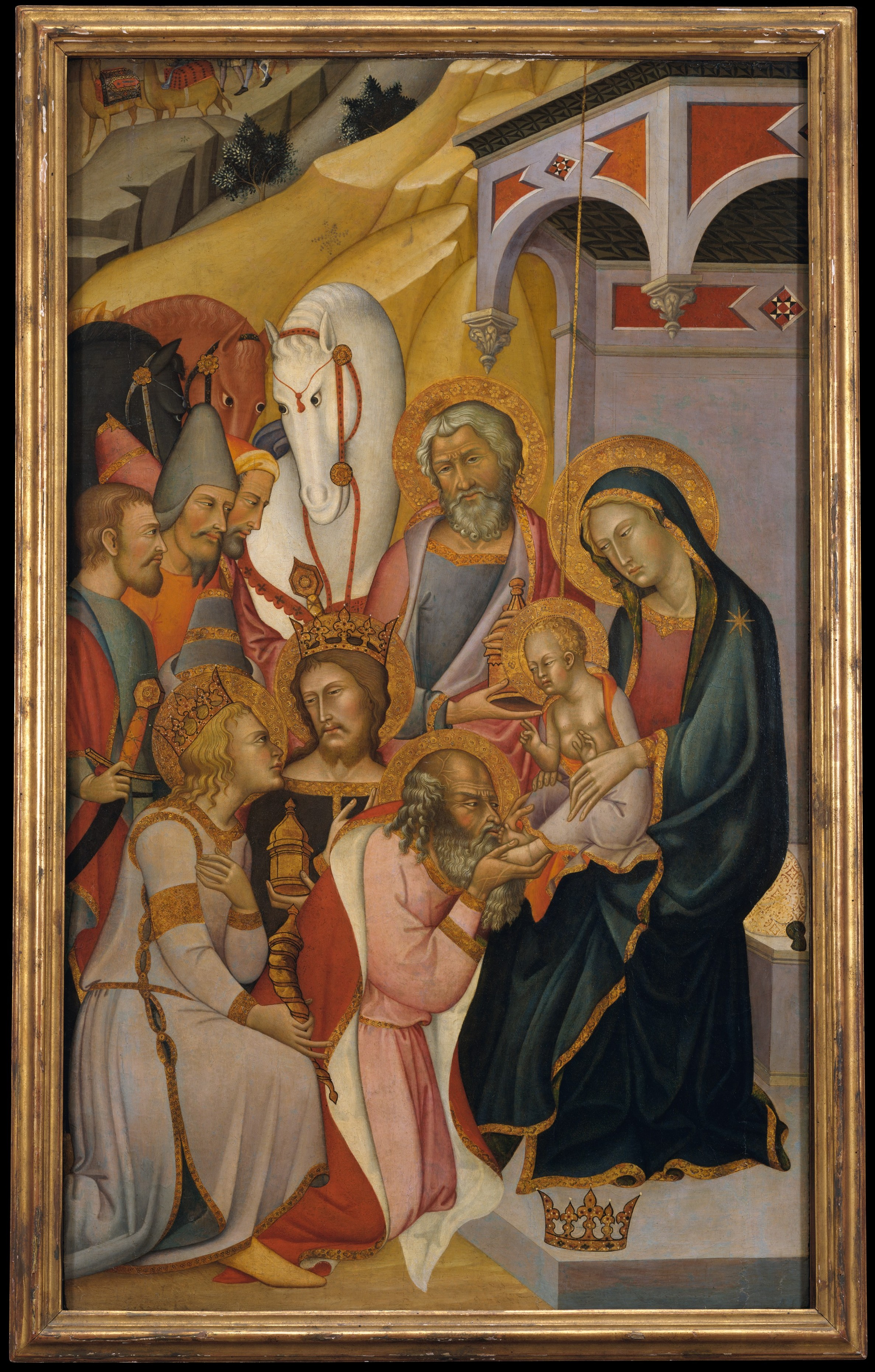
The Adoration of the Magi (c. 1390), tempera and gold on wood, Metropolitan Museum of Art, New York
