= Lippo Vanni =

Italian painter

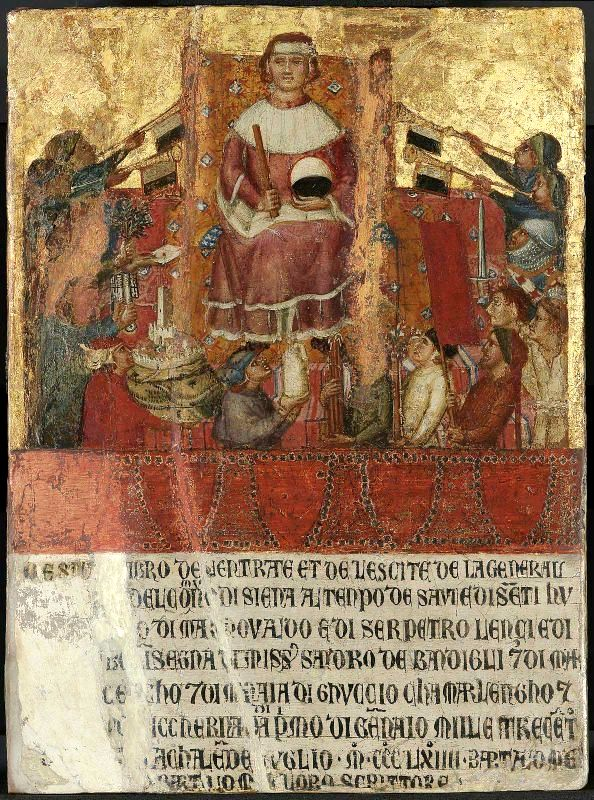
Biccherna Cover. The Tribute Offering, from ca. 1364.

Lippo Vanni was a 14th-century Italian painter and miniaturist who was active in his native Siena.

He painted miniatures for the Santa Maria della Scala in Siena in 1344, and his name first appears in the Guild in 1355. In 1352 he executed a Coronation of the Virgin for the Biccherna, the Sienese Ministry of Finance. In 1359, together with Nello Betti, he executed some work in the Palazzo Pubblico, and in 1372 he painted an Annunciation for the cloisters of San Domenico at Siena, portions of which still exist. In 1375 he received six gold florins and thirty-one soldi for painting the doors of the great crucifix in the cathedral of Siena.

A 14th-century triptych of Saint Andrew by Lippo Vanni hangs in the Sala del Senato or Academic Senate conference room of the Pontifical University of Saint Thomas Aquinas, Angelicum in Rome.

== Notes ==
There are paintings by Lippo Vanni in the Minneapolis Institute of Art ("Crucifixion")and the Lowe Art Museum in Coral Gables, Florida worthy of attention.
