= Taddeo di Bartolo =

Italian painter (c. 1363–1422)

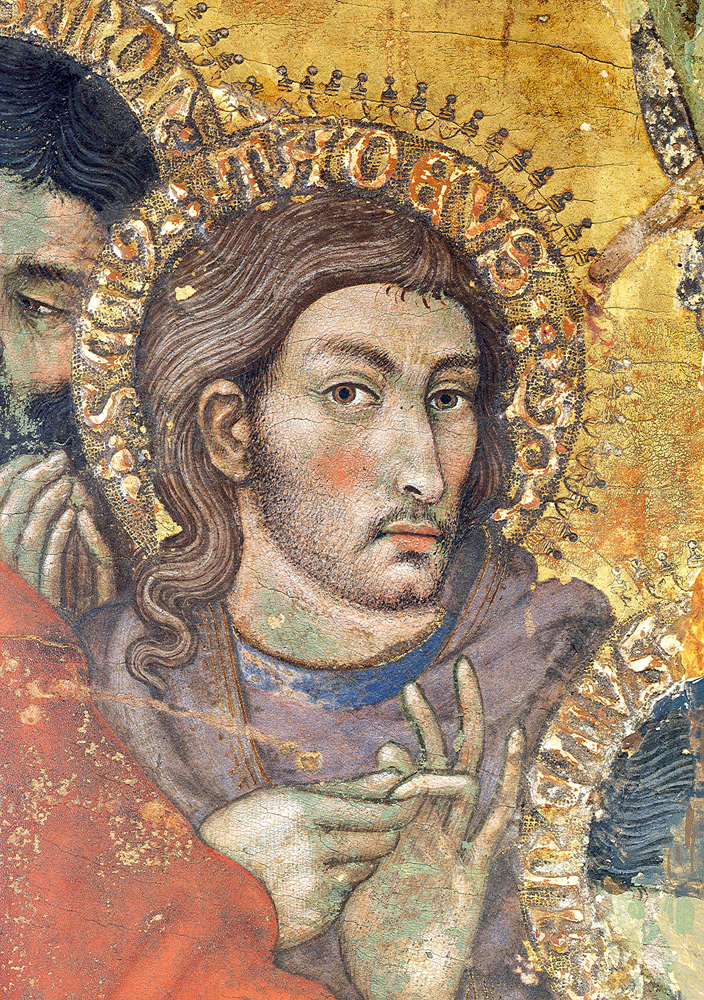
Taddeo Di Bartolo, Self Portrait, Detail of Assumption of the Virgin, Located in the Duomo di Santa Maria dell'Assunta at Montepulciano.

Taddeo di Bartolo (c. 1363 – 26 August 1422), also known as Taddeo Bartoli, was an Italian painter of the Sienese School during the early Renaissance. His biography appears in the Vite of Giorgio Vasari, who claims that Taddeo was the uncle of Domenico di Bartolo.

== Biography ==
Taddeo di Bartolo was born in Siena. The exact year of his birth is unknown, but possibly between 1363 and 1365. He was the son of a certain Bartolo di Maestro Mino, a barber, and not of the painter Bartolo di Fredi, as Vasari believed, and therefore Taddeo was not the brother of Andrea di Bartolo. Around 1389, Taddeo was admitted to the Sienese Guild of artists, where he mastered the art of painting among his Sienese colleagues. In 1389, he traveled to Collegarli, to the San Miniato al Tedesco hills, and to Pisa. One of his earliest documented works is the painting of The Virgin and Child Enthroned, signed and dated in 1390, executed in the church of San Paolo in Pisa. In 1393, he traveled to San Gimignano, where he executed the altarpiece of the Virgin and Child and Saints (1395) for the Sardi and Campigli Chapel in the church of San Francesco. This latter work illustrates Taddeo's earlier style. The thin, elegant figures, and flowing lines of the drapery patterns reflect influence from his Sienese predecessors, such as Simone Martini and Ambrogio Lorenzetti.

From 1400 to 1401, Taddeo worked at the Palazzo Pubblico of Siena, where he executed twelve small panels, of which only nine survive today; they are displayed at the Opera of the Duomo in Siena. These panels display Taddeo's craftsmanship in smaller scale work, a skill seen also in many of his Trecento contemporaries. Around 1401, Taddeo painted in Duomo di Santa Maria Assunta in Montepulciano the celebrated altarpiece, The Assumption of the Virgin and scenes from The Passion of Christ. This piece was intended for religious and devotional functions. Taddeo worked to accommodate the established conventions of altarpiece painting, while simultaneously stylizing the pieces to fit their respective site. In 1403, Taddeo produced two works in Perugia, now on display in the public gallery there: the Virgin and Child with two Angels and St Bernard and the Descent of the Holy Spirit. These two works exemplify Taddeo's superior talents, exhibiting delicate coloring and vast human expression, even though at later periods they have been painted over.

In 1406, Taddeo was commissioned to repaint the interior the chapel of the Palazzo Pubblico of Siena, which involved destroying all the existing paintings. Many of his new paintings represent the Life of the Madonna, including the Death of the Virgin in which Jesus descends, takes her hand, and receives her in the form of an infant.

Taddeo di Bartolo died in Siena in 1422, aged about 60.

== Works ==
Much of his early work was in Pisa, where he was responsible for the frescoes of Paradise and Hell in the Cathedral, and for paintings in the Palazzo Pubblico and the church of San Francesco.

At the Collegiata di San Gimignano, Taddeo painted a fresco depicting The Last Judgment. The Museo Civico of San Gimignano, displays a painting by Taddeo depicting Saint Gimignano holding the town in his lap (c. 1391).

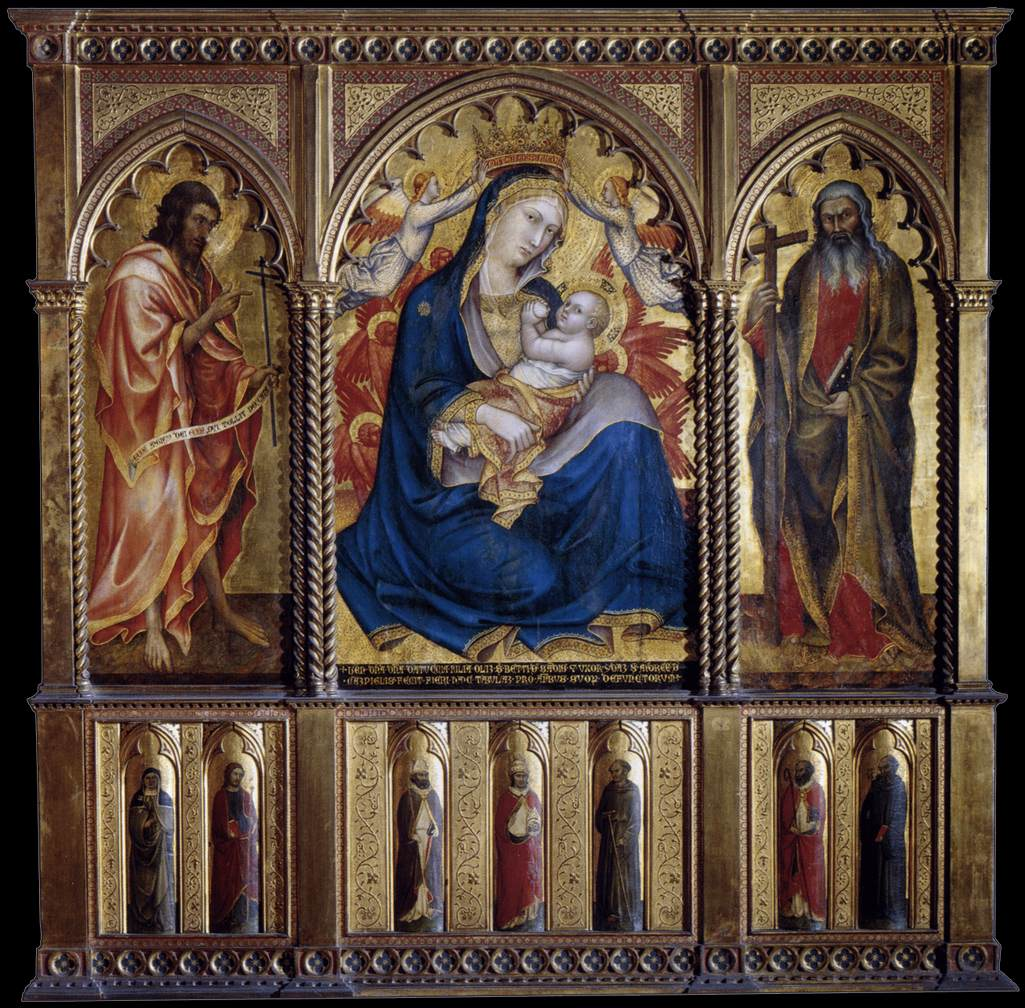
Virgin and Child with St John the Baptist and St Andrew. Circa 1395

A triptych of the Virgin and Child with St John the Baptist and St Andrew, painted around 1395, is on display at the Szépművészeti Museum of Fine Arts in Budapest. A massive triptych, Assumption of the Virgin, painted in 1401, is displayed in the 16th-century Duomo of Santa Maria dell'Assunta at Montepulciano.

Taddeo's Madonna with Child, Four Angels and Saint John the Baptist and Saint Andrew may be seen in the Oratory of the Company of Saint Catherine of the Night at Santa Maria della Scala, Siena. He also painted allegories and figures from Roman history (1413–14), and the Funeral of the Virgin (1409) at the Palazzo Pubblico in Siena. His St Elizabeth of Hungary is on display in the Perkins Collection of the Basilica of St Francis in Assisi.

=== Other works and current locations ===
- Madonna and Child (c. 1400), painted with tempera and oil on a panel, in the Wadsworth Atheneum
- Madonna and Child in the Museum of Fine Arts in San Francisco
- Madonna and Child in the Musée du Petit Palais in Avignon, France
- "Madonna and Child" in the Ball State University Museum of Art in Muncie, Indiana
- Saint Germinianus in the Raclin Murphy Museum of Art in Notre Dame, Indiana
- Annunciation in the Bergen Art Museum in Bergen, Norway
- Annunciation (1401) in the campus chapel of Australian Catholic University in Melbourne
- Christ Meeting Mother on Way to Calvary in the Worcester Art Museum in Massachusetts
- Madonna and Child With Angels in the Fogg Art Museum in Cambridge, Massachusetts
- Madonna and Child and Saints in the Palazzo Blu in Pisa
- "The Crucifixion" in the Art Institute of Chicago

== Gallery ==
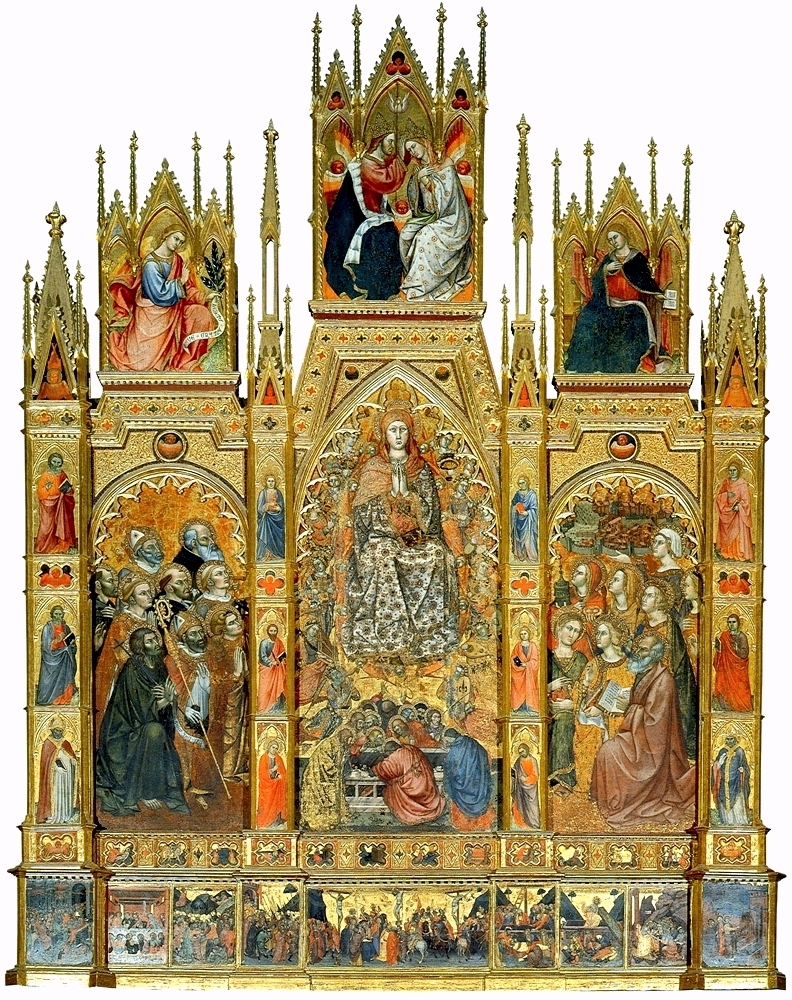
The Assumption of the Virgin Located at Duomo of Santa Maria dell'Assunta at Montepulciano.

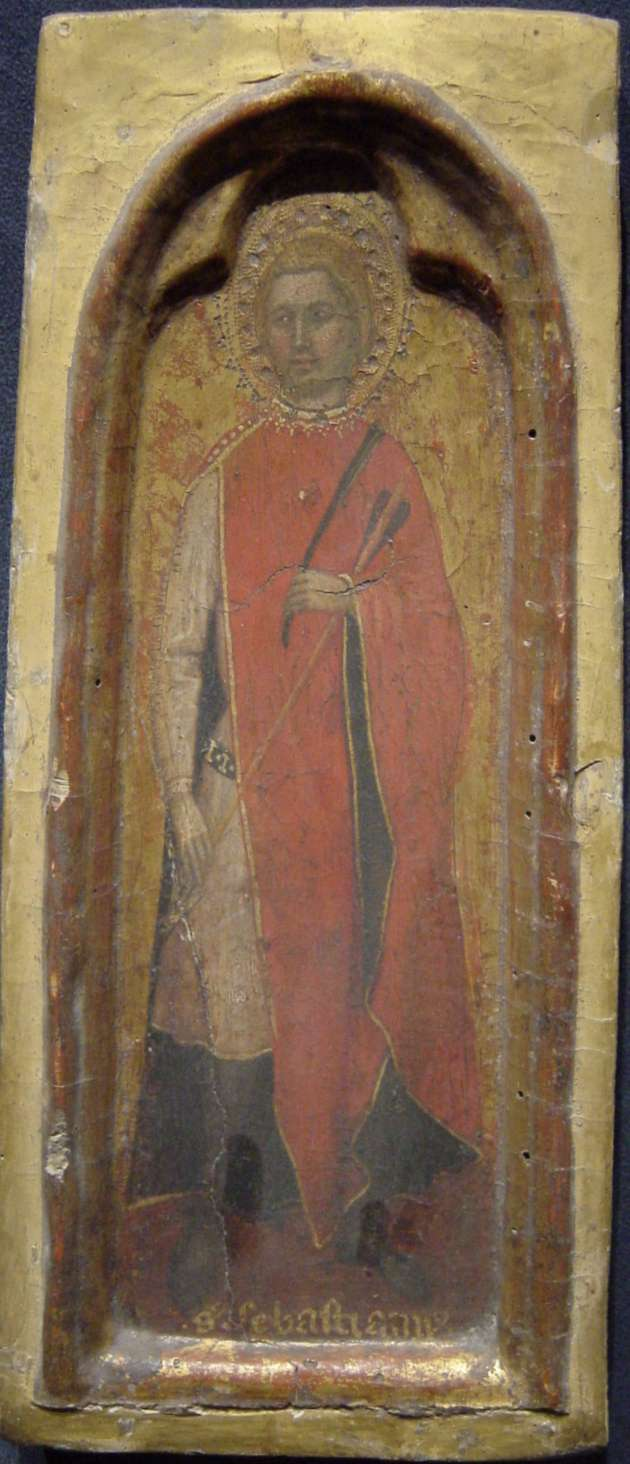
St. Sebastian, Museo di Capodimonte, Naples, Italy.

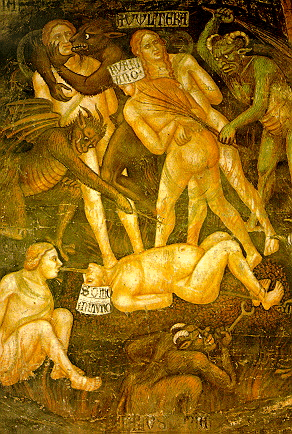
Sodomite (on the ground) at Last Judgement fresco, Collegiate Church of San Gimignano

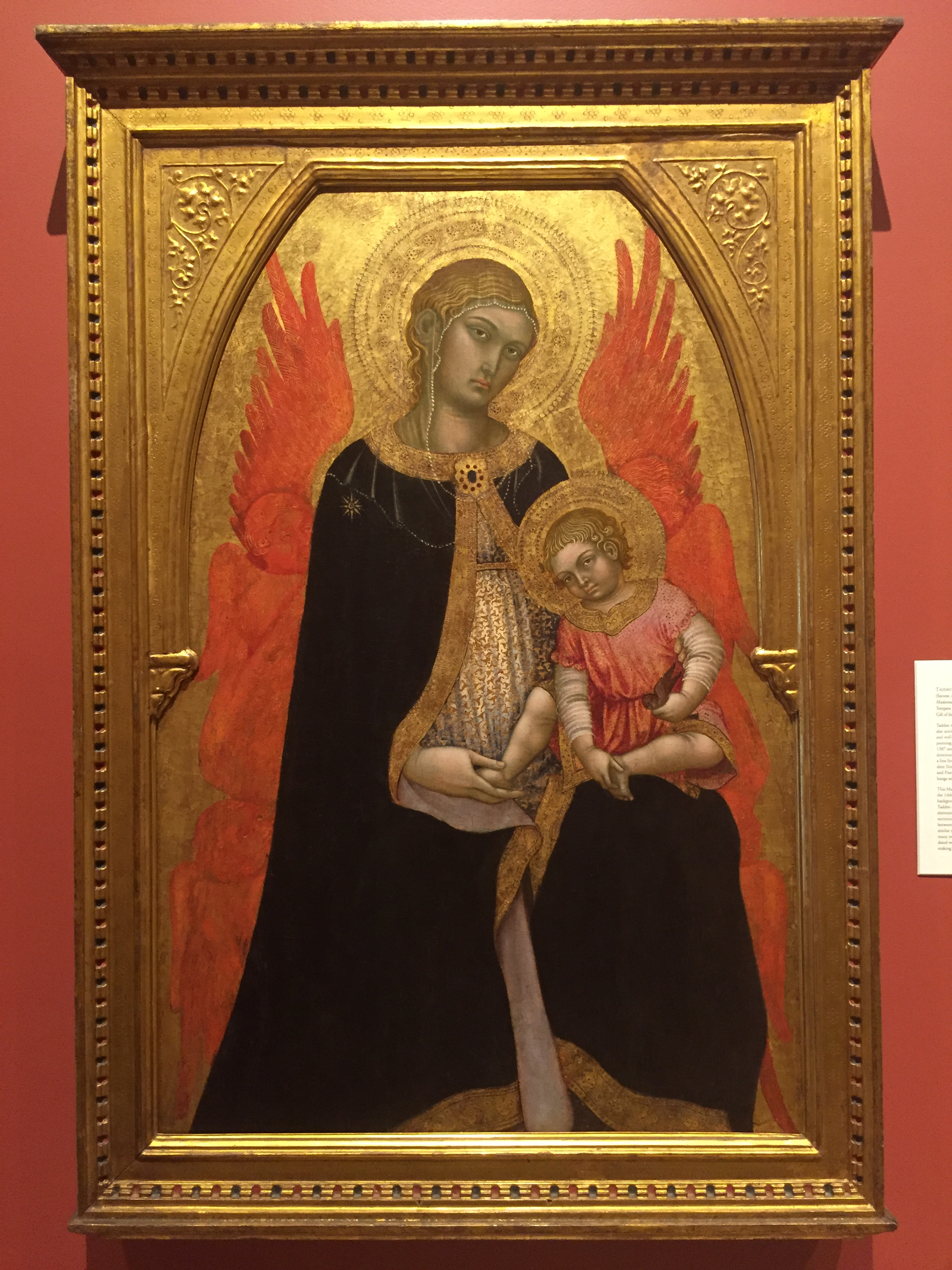
"Madonna and Child", ca 1410. Tempera on Panel. Located at the Philbrook Museum in Tulsa, OK.

== See also ==
- Andrea di Bartolo
- Domenico di Bartolo
- Gregorio di Cecco
