= Andrea di Bartolo =

Medieval Italian painter, stained glass designer and illuminator of the Sienese School

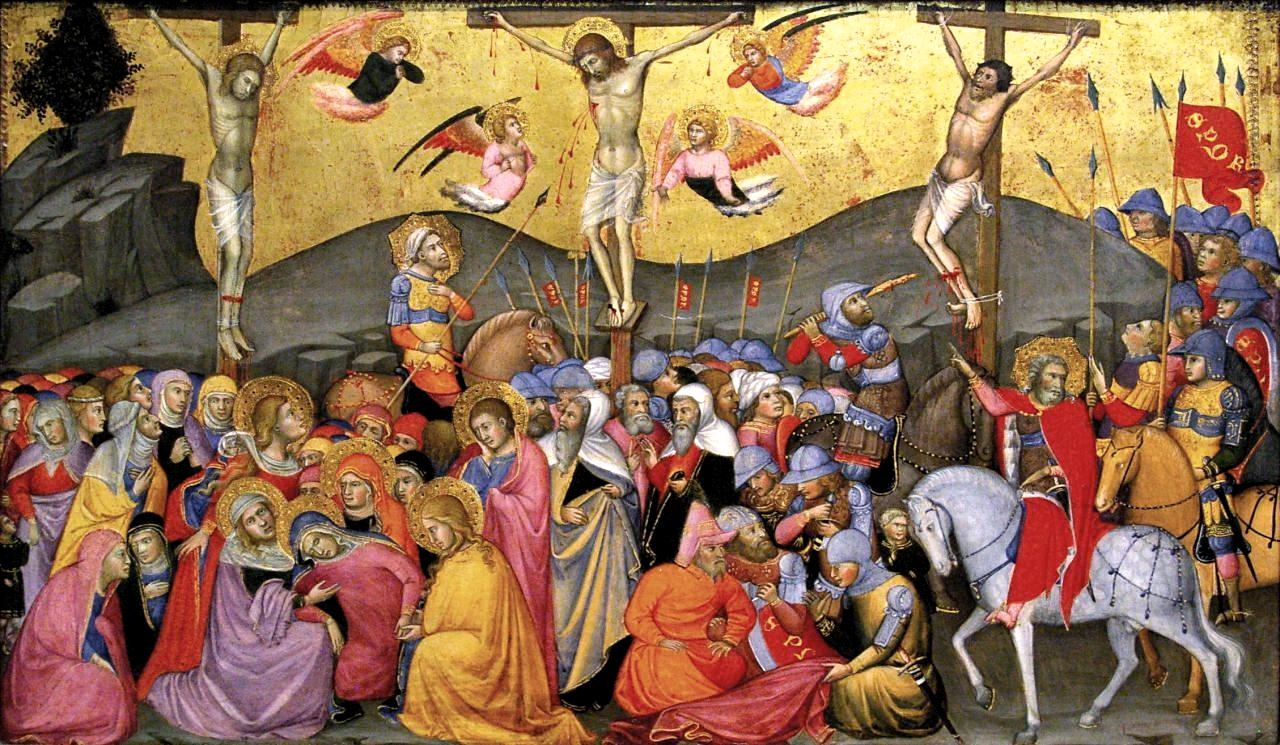
Crucifixion.

Andrea di Bartolo or Andrea di Bartolo Cini (1360/70 – 1428) was an Italian painter, stained glass designer and illuminator of the Sienese School mainly known for his religious subjects. He was active between 1389–1428 in the area in and around Siena.

== Biography ==
Andrea di Bartolo was the son and pupil of Bartolo di Fredi, a very prominent painter in Siena. His youth was spent working in his father's workshop which received many prestigious orders.

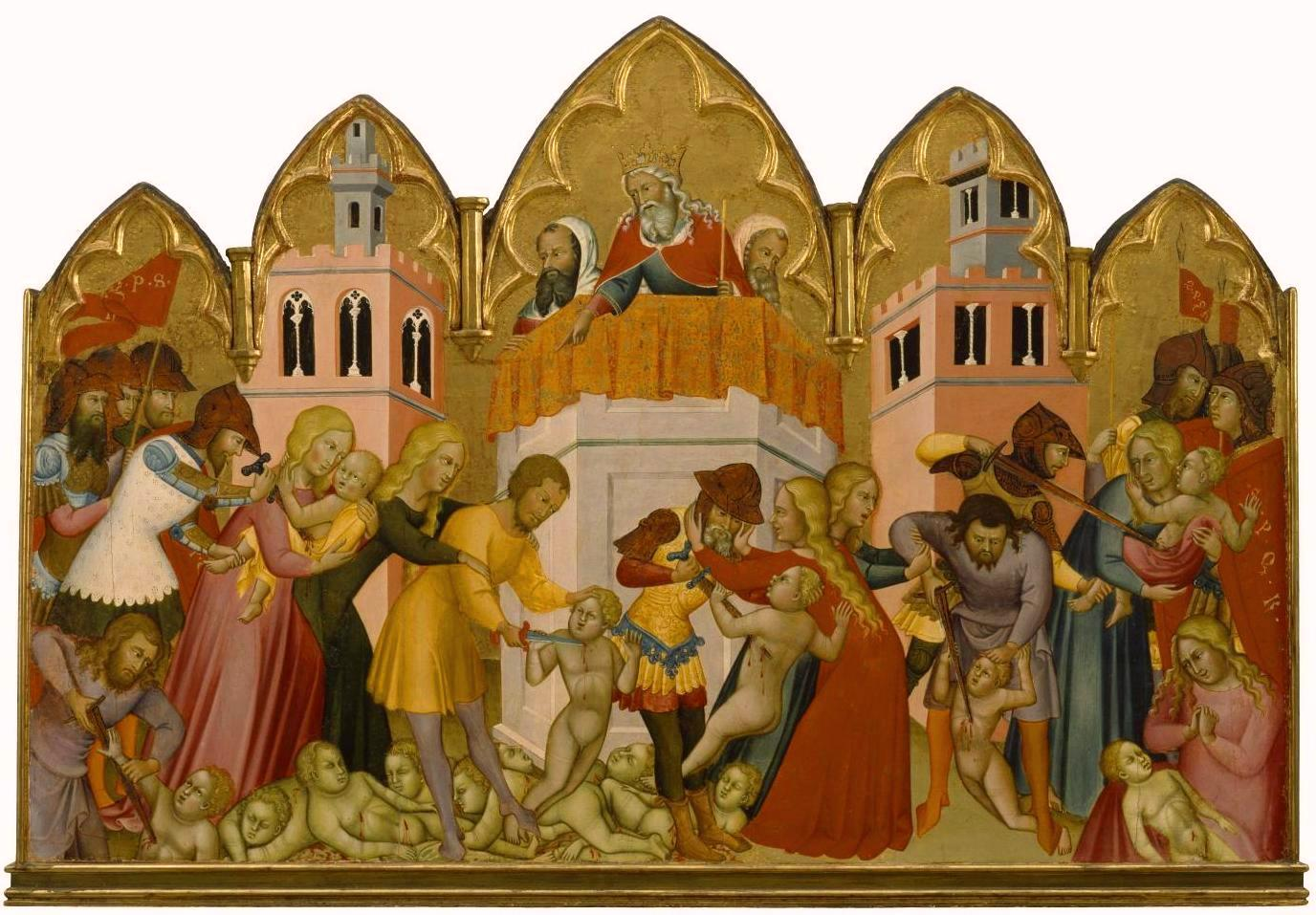
Massacre of the Innocents.

He collaborated with his father and Luca di Tommè on an altarpiece (now lost) for the altar of the shoemaker's guild in the cathedral of Siena in 1389. This is his first documented work. However, it is believed that his hand can be discerned in works of his father painted between 1380 and 1389, such as in the Massacre of the Innocents (Walters Art Museum).

Andrea likely set up his own workshop around 1390. He was extremely successful in Siena and obtained numerous commissions even from as far as Veneto. His patrons were drawn from the same circles as his father, mendicant religious houses such as the Franciscans of Montalcino and the Dominicans of Siena. From his studio he produced a large number of works, some of which have survived and are found in various museums around the world. Like Simone Martini, he travelled far to execute work for patrons, including the Marches, Veneto and Treviso.

It is possible Andrea was the father of the painter Giorgio di Andrea di Bartolo (active 1409 to 1428). He died at Siena in 1428.

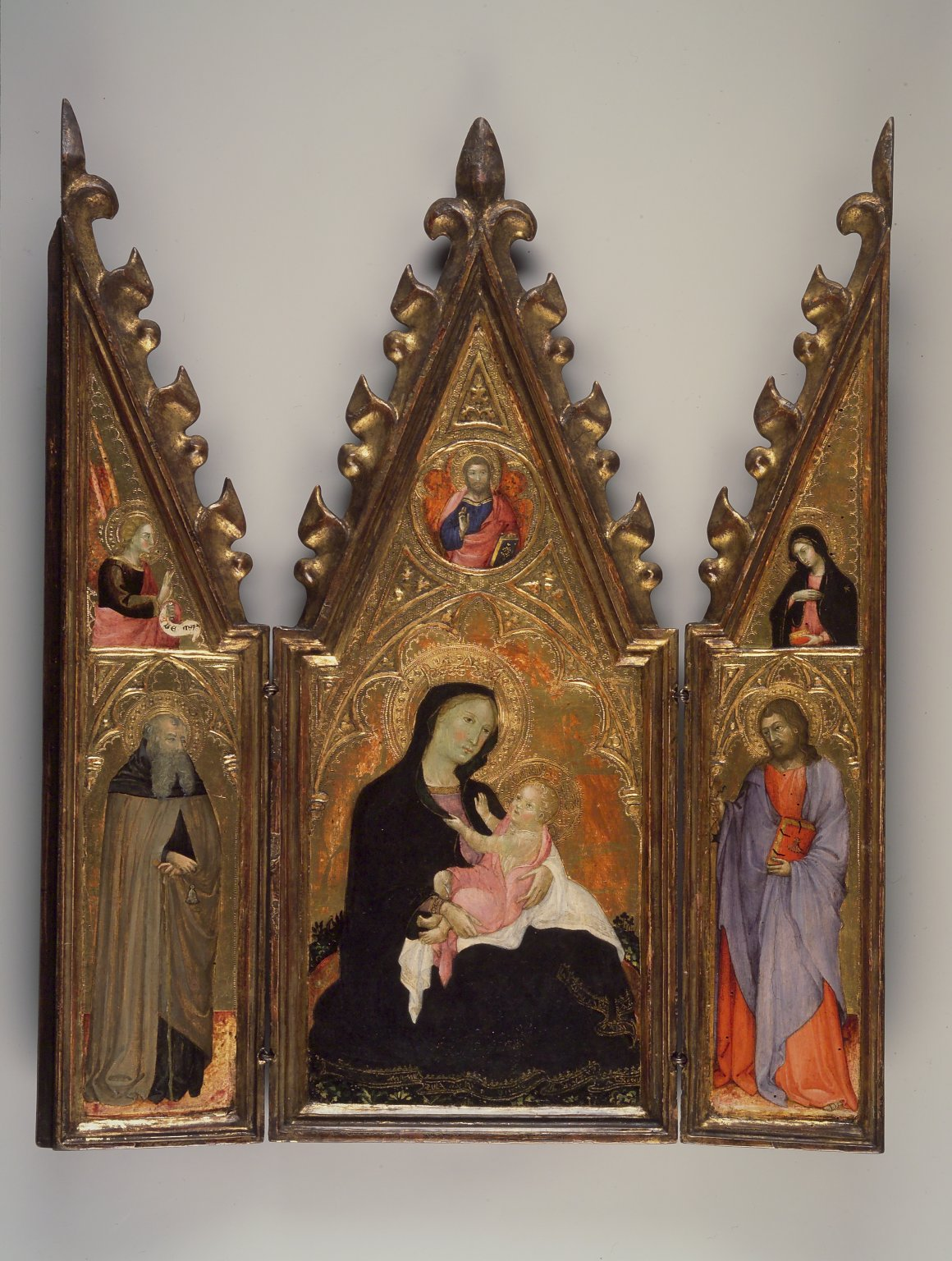
Madonna of Humility.

== Work ==
Most of Bartolo's works are religious works of art. Throughout his career Andrea imitated his father's paintings. While he worked on projects jointly with his father, he developed an independent style. Other collaborations were with Luca di Tommè.

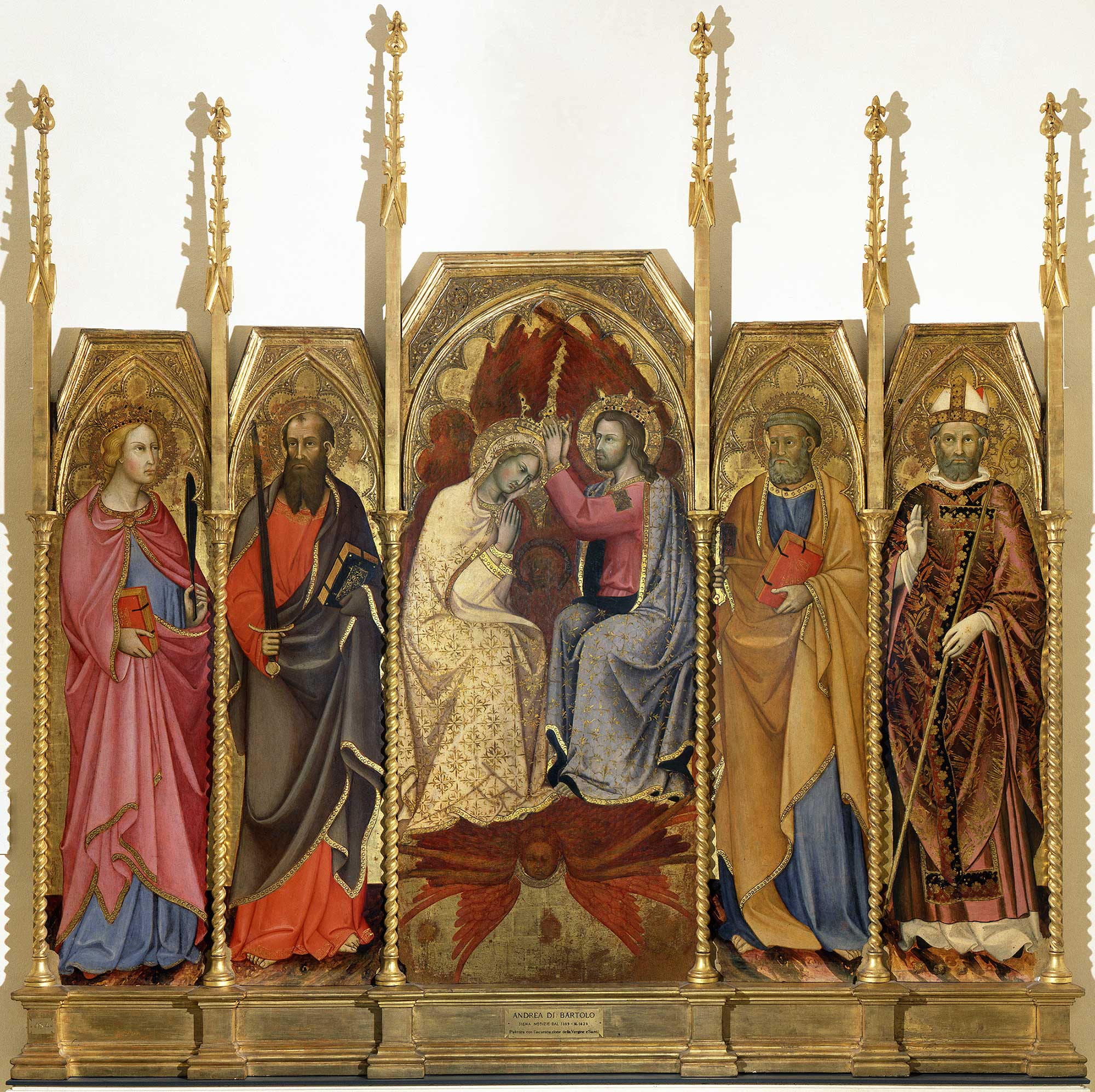
Coronation of the Virgin.

Andrea di Bartolo's creativity is a continuation of the work of his father, who in turn drew on the tradition of Siena, begun by Duccio and Simone Martini. Still Andrea's own style can also be recognised early on. Andrea had a more summary drawing style and a softer modeling technique than his father and paid less attention to naturalistic detail and expressionism.

Andrea's style remained solidly rooted in the Sienese traditions. However, if required he could absorb foreign influences, in particular in his commissions from the Venetian region. For instance, his Coronation of the Virgin (Venice, Ca' d'Oro) shows in its iconography and rich ornamental elements the influence of Venetian painting.

His later work shows the influence of Taddeo di Bartolo, Martino di Bartolomeo and Spinello Aretino. This is also evident in his manuscript illuminations, in which he showed himself more independent from the style of his father.
