= Luca di Tommè =

Italian painter

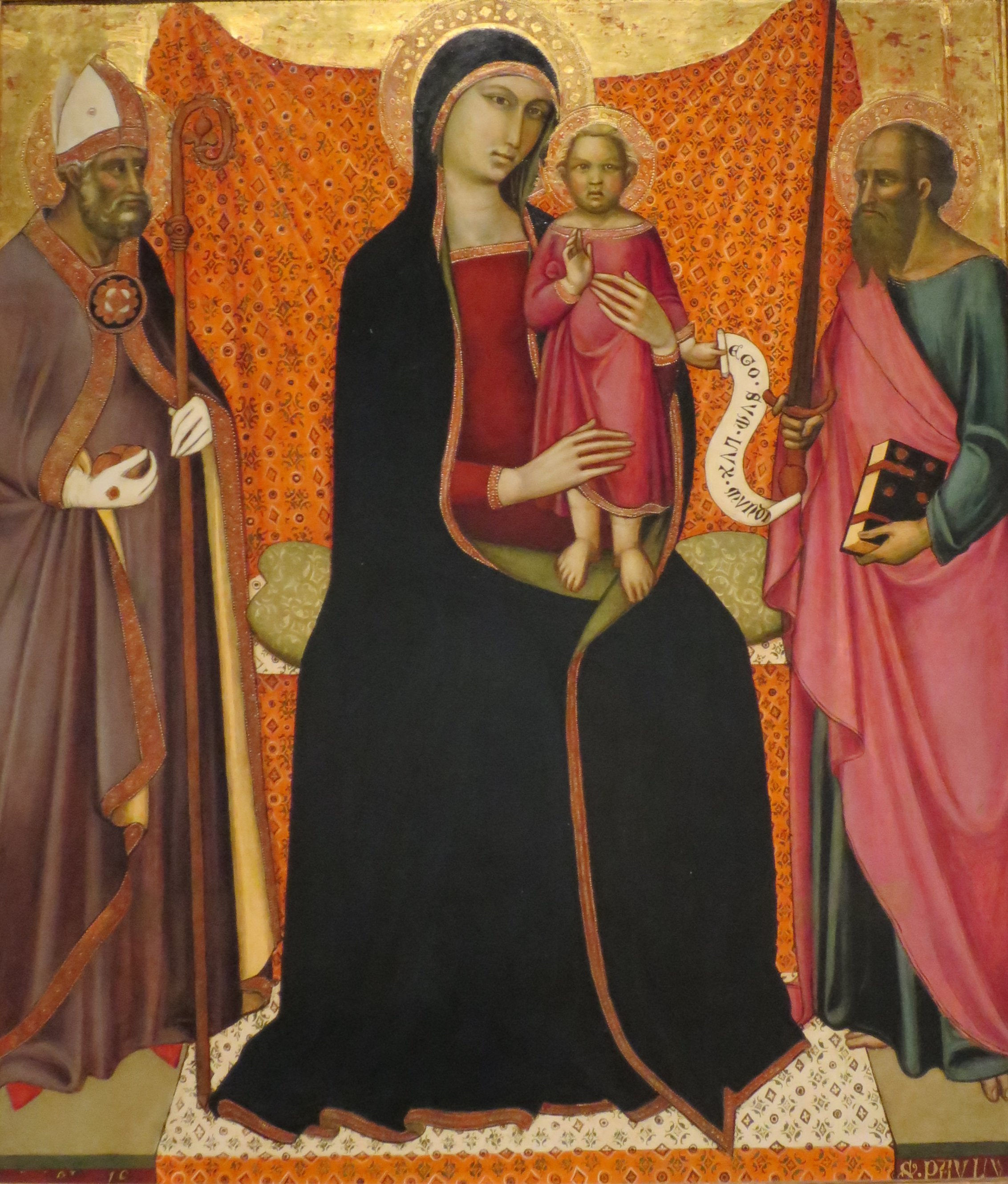
Luca di Tommè's painting of Madonna and Child, tempera on panel

Luca di Tommè (or Luca Thome) (c. 1330–1389) was an Italian painter active between 1356 and 1389 in Siena. He worked in the style established by earlier Sienese painters Duccio, Simone Martini, Pietro Lorenzetti and Ambrogio Lorenzetti. More than 50 works have been attributed to him. This large output contributed to the long-term survival of the decorative Sienese style well into the 15th century.

He worked in 1389 with Bartolo di Fredi and Andrea di Bartolo on a large commission for an altarpiece for one of the cathedral chapels in Siena. He created his images using tempera on wood panels, in a manner typical of the 14th century.
