= Basilica of San Domenico, Siena =

Basilica church in Siena, Tuscany, Italy

Coordinates: 43°19′11.04″N 11°19′36.99″E

The Basilica of San Domenico, also known as Basilica Cateriniana, is a basilica church in Siena, Tuscany, Italy, one of the most important in the city. The basilica is an example of Cistercian Gothic style.

== History ==
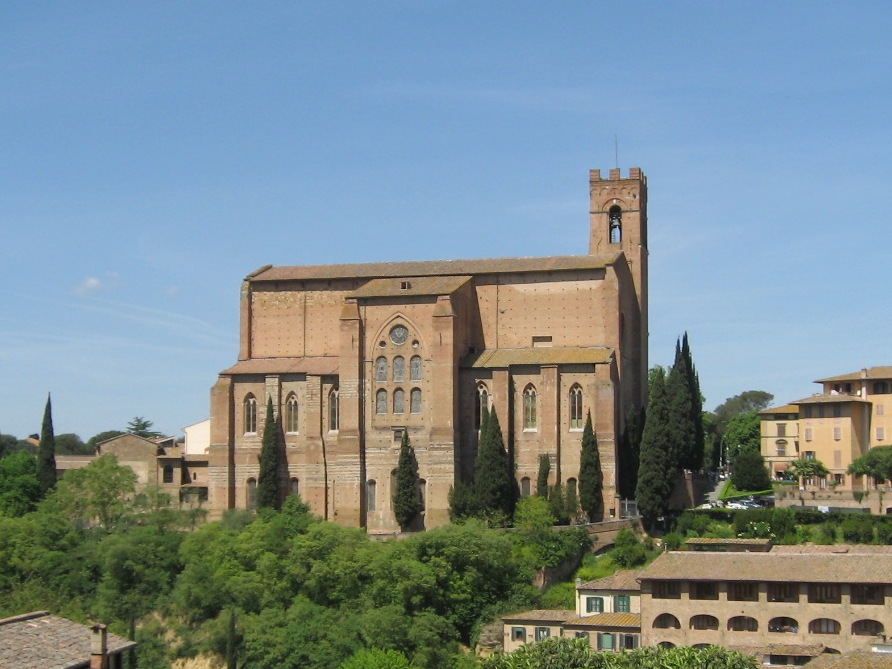
Basilica of San Domenico in Siena

The church was begun in 1226–1265, on the hill of Camporegio which the Dominicans had received as a gift from the Malavolti family. It was enlarged in the 14th century resulting in the Gothic appearance it has now. However, aspects of the Gothic structure were subsequently destroyed by fires in 1443, 1456 and 1531, and further damage later resulted from military occupation (1548–1552). The Baroque style also came to the basilica when the altars were rebuilt in the 17th and 18th centuries. These features were later removed in 1941 during fascist occupation.

The church's alternate name, Basilica Cateriniana, is attributed to St. Catherine of Siena, who lived nearby.

It is a large edifice built, like many contemporary edifices of the mendicant orders, in brick, with a lofty bell tower on the left (this was reduced in height after an earthquake in 1798). The interior is on the Egyptian cross plan with a huge nave covered by trusses and with a transept featuring high chapels. The entrance to the basilica is on the left side of the church because the area behind the façade is occupied by the raised structure of the Chapel of the Vaults.

The funeral of painter Simone Martini was held here in 1344. The church contains several relics of St. Catherine of Siena, who attended Mass here.

The old Chapter Room, the old Sacresty, the Refectory and the Dormitory were all built with the original Church and the Cloister was frescoed by Lippo Memmi and Lippo Vanni. Memmi did a small Maesta for the cloister. In 1372 Vanni painted an Annunciation for the cloisters.

== Interior ==
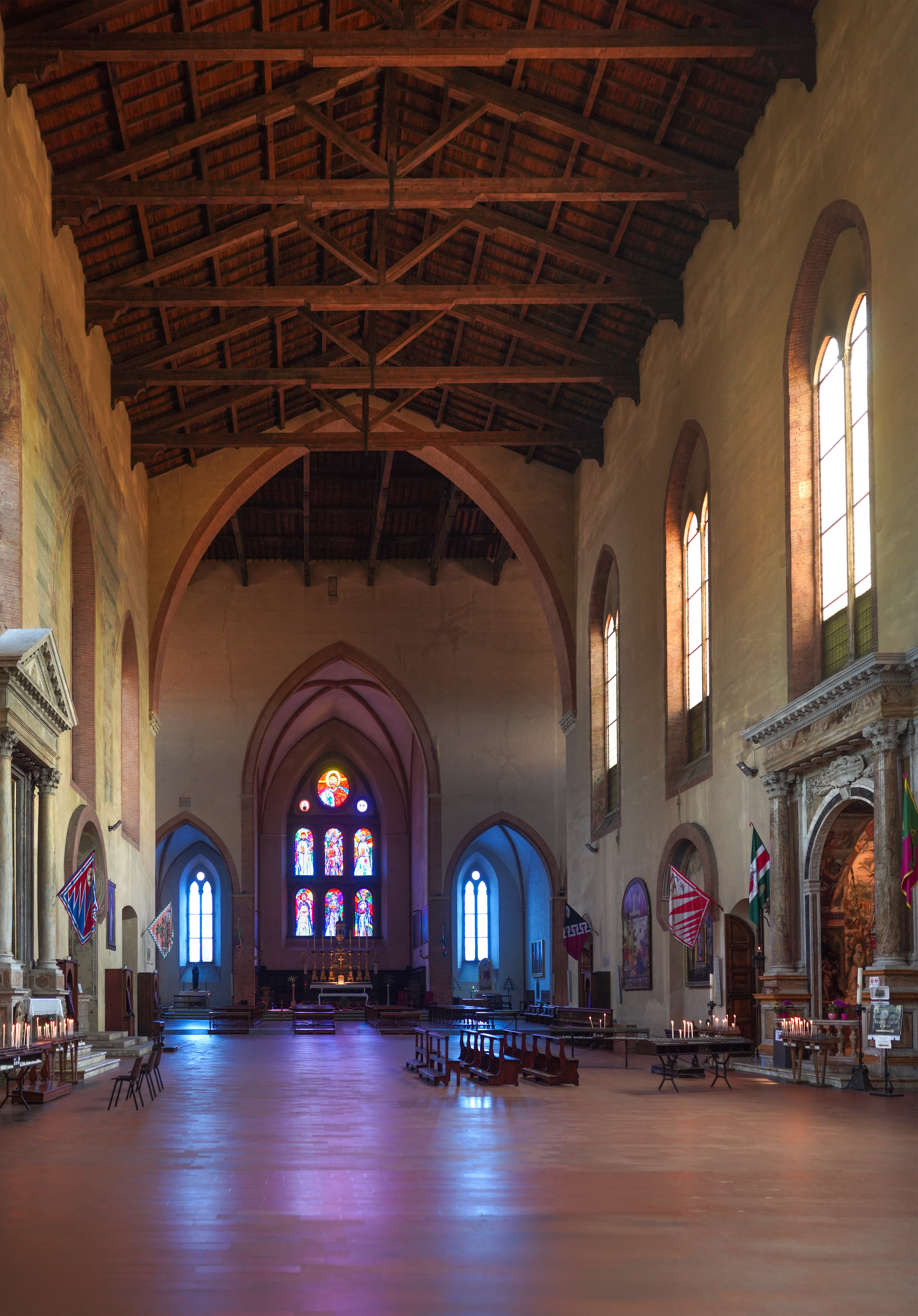
Interior of the Basilica nave

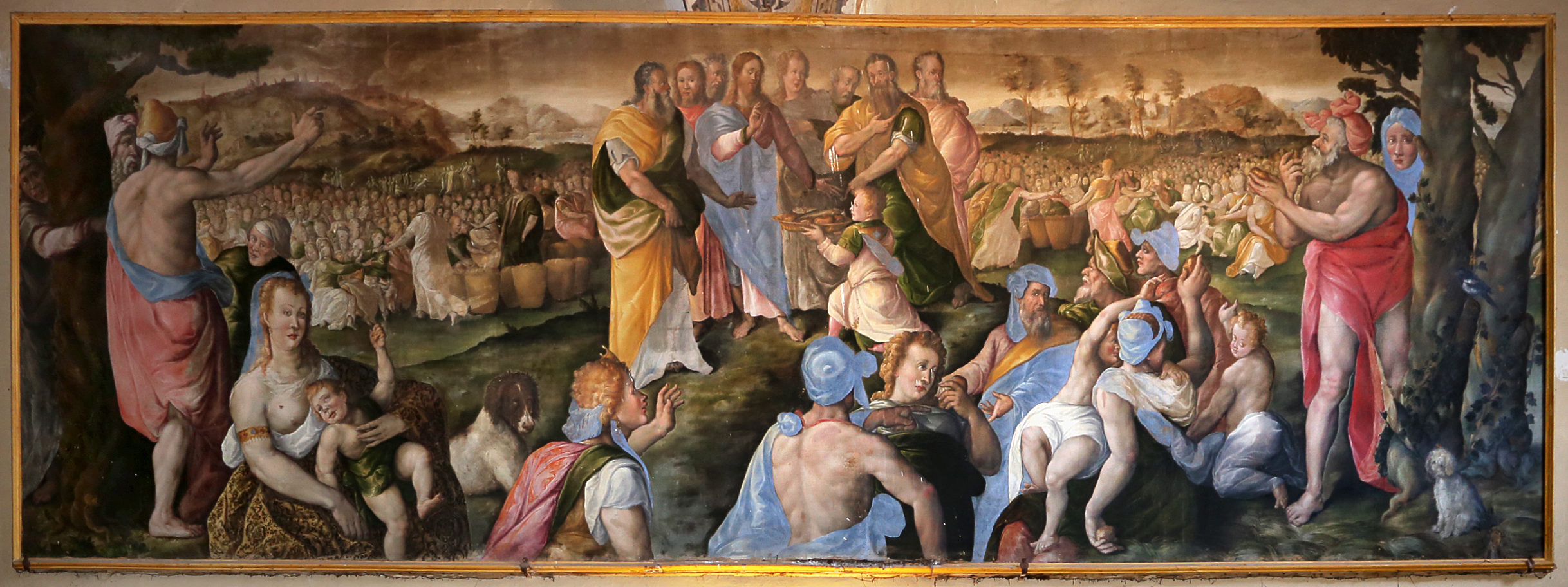
Ludovico Dondo, Multiplication of the Loaves and Fishes, 1635

=== Cappella delle Volte ===
This is an old oratory of the Third Order Dominicans, connected to numerous episodes of Catherine of Siena's life. It houses the Canonization of St. Catherine by Mattia Preti, flanked by two 1602 paintings by Crescenzio Gambarelli. Other works by the latter are also present. The main wall has a portrait of St. Catherine.

=== Left wall of the nave ===
The left wall of the nave has the famous painting Madonna with Child by Francesco di Vannuccio, framed by an Eternal with Saint by Il Sodoma and by a predella with fifteen Stories of the New Testament by Antonio Magagna. Rutilio Manetti painted a St. Anthony Abbot's Exorcism, Sebastiano Folli a St. Catherine of Alexandria and Francesco Vanni a St. Hyacinth Saving a Statue of the Madonna from a Fire.

=== Right wall of the nave ===
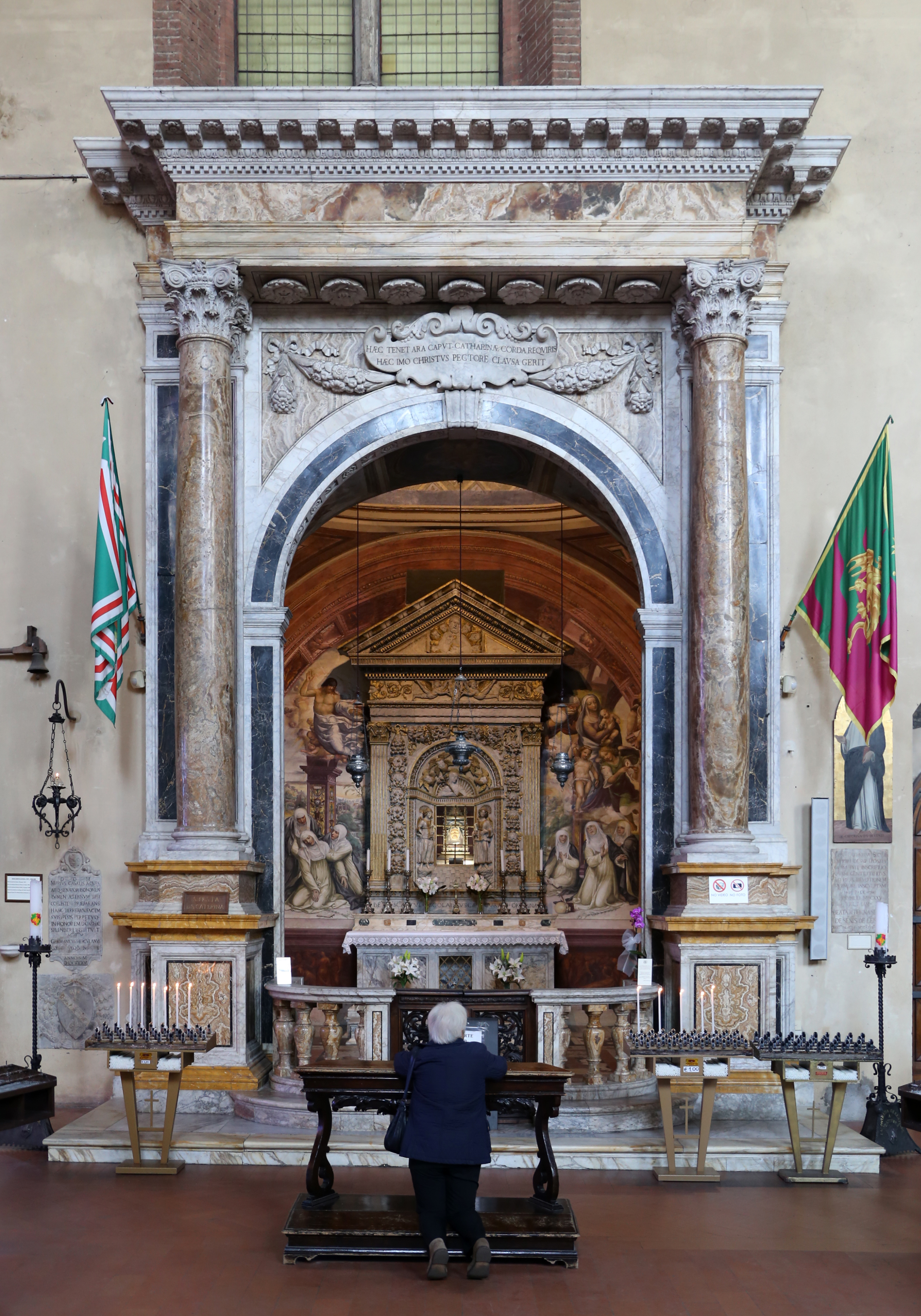
Chapel of Saint Catherine

The altars on the right side are decorated by an Appearance of the Virgin by Stefano Volpi (1630), a Nativity of the Virgin by Alessandro Casolani (1584) and a reliquary of St. Catherine's relics.

They are followed by the St. Catherine Chapel in Baroque style, with, in the centre, an altar housing the saint's head and thumb. Il Sodoma provided a Fainting and Ecstasy of St. Catherine and Death of Niccolò di Tuldo for the chapel, while by Francesco Vanni is a St. Catherine's Exorcism (1593–1596). The 15th-century marble pavement, featuring Orpheus and animals, is attributed to Francesco di Giorgio.

The right wall has a fresco by Pietro Lorenzetti and the Adoration of the Shepherds by Francesco di Giorgio, completed by a lunette by Matteo di Giovanni and a predella by Bernardino Fungai.

=== Transept ===
On the right transept is altar dedicated to Blessed Ambrogio Sansedoni, also portrayed in a canvas by Francesco Rustici (1611–12).

Notable amongst the chapels are the second, entitled to the martyrs of the German Nation, and the third, which includes a Madonna with Child and the Saint Jerome and John the Baptist by Matteo di Giovanni.

The fourth chapel has a Baroque canvas by Raffaello Vanni (1649) and a St. Anthony the Abbot from 1426. The Majesty by Guido da Siena (dated to 1221, but probably from 1265 to 1270 with additions by a Duccio's follower) is in the centre of the fifth chapel, where are also works by Matteo di Giovanni, Benvenuto di Giovanni and two frescoes by Giuseppe Nicola Nasini. The left transept ends with the altar of St. Dominic.

=== Other ===
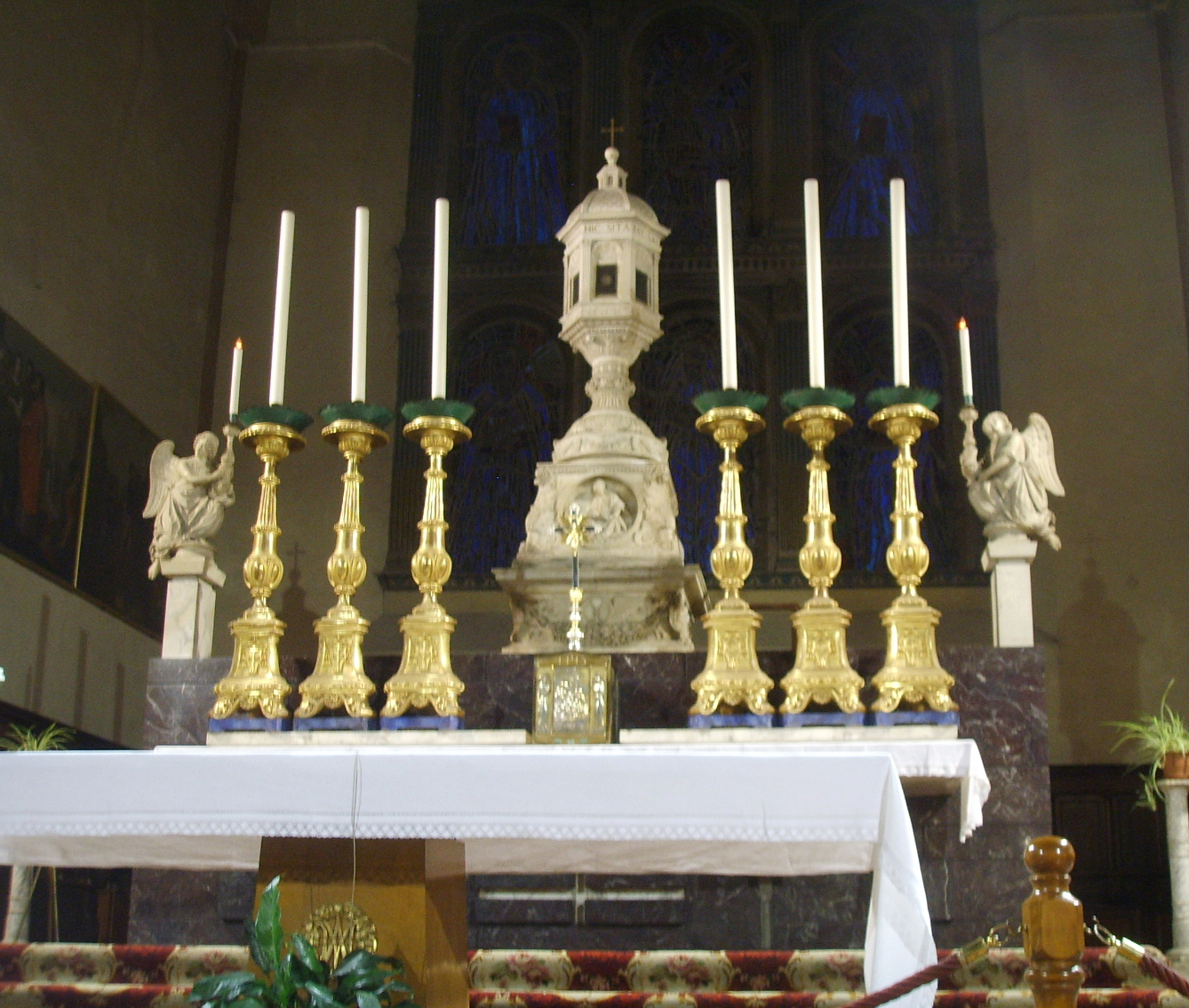
High Altar

The altar has a ciborium with two angels by Benedetto da Maiano (1475–1480), while in the apse is a Death of St. Peter Martyr by Arcangelo Salimbeni (1579) and St. Thomas and the Pope by Galgano Perpignani.

The crypt, in Gothic style, can also be visited. It houses a crucifix by Sano di Pietro and a Crucifixion signed by Ventura Salimbeni (1600).
