= Crescenzio Gambarelli =

Italian painter

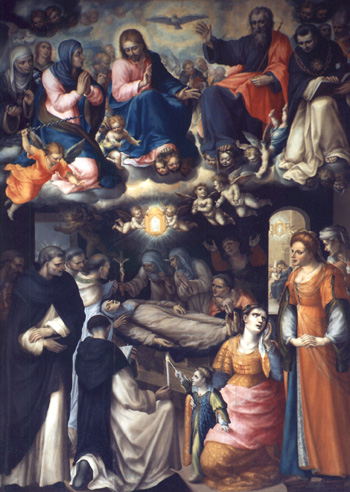
Death of St Catherine of Siena (1602), Cappella delle Volte, church of San Domenico

Crescenzio Gambarelli (active from 1591 to 1622) was an Italian painter of late-Mannerism or proto-Baroque, active mainly in Siena.

== Biography ==
He worked alongside Rutilio Manetti for some projects. He frescoed the ceilings for the Oratory of San Rocco. He also painted for the Oratory of St Catherine of Siena, two canvases depicting: St Catherine offers her garments to Jesus appearing to her as a poor pilgrim and Jesus offers St Catherine a crucifix. He painted a St Bernardino of Siena pleads before Pope Martin V for San Domenico, Siena. He also painted an altarpiece for the church of San Martino, Siena.
