= Bonifazio Bevilacqua Aldobrandini =

Italian cardinal

Coat of arms of the Bevilacqua family

Bonifazio Bevilacqua Aldobrandini (1571 – 7 April 1627) was an Italian Cardinal. He was the uncle of Pope Gregory XIV.

== Biography ==
In 1601, Pope Clement VIII associated Count Luigi Bevilacqua and his two brothers, Conte Bonifazio IV (1571–1627) and Conte Alfonso II (1565–1610), with his own family granting them use of his family’s Aldobrandini Coat of Arms and the right to appoint courts and judges in their territories. They were also made Counts of the Palace and Knights of the Lateran and of the Golden Spur. Luigi also acquired citizenship in Rome, Bologna, Mantua and Montferrat with the Castle of Fontanile, Perugia, and Assisi. In 1607, Pope Paul V appointed him Captain of the Curiasses and the Grand Duke of Tuscany Ferdinando I gave him the Leadership of the Helmets. In addition, Clement made Bonifazio a cardinal in 1599. Bonifazio was a “secret waiter” of Pope Gregory XIII in his youth, and received his doctorate in law at the University of Padua. Later, Bonifazio became Archdeacon of Ferrara and the Latin Patriarch of Constantinople.

Bonifazio was also elected Governor of Fano, and Governor of the Duchy of Camerino which were part of the Papal States at the time. During the conclave of Pope Gregory XV, Bonifazio formed strong alliances on the side of the French against Cardinal Guido Bentivoglio and the Spanish. When Gregory became pope, he gave Bonifazio citizenship in the Republic of Lucca. Due to the political animosity among the cardinals during his election, Pope Gregory XV abolished these abuses by making the balloting secret with no cardinal able to vote for himself.

When Bonifacio was made Cardinal, he was in charge of the diocese of Sabina, and Perugia, both in Umbria. He was also made the Prefect of the Cardinal’s Consul, Referendario of the Cardinal’s Senate, and elected Prefect of all of the Catholic Church’s Assemblies. Pope Clement VIII bestowed his own family name, Aldobrandini, with all hereditary rights to Bonifazio since he loved him like a son. Bonifazio had the sepulchral monument of Torquato Tasso built in the church of S. Onofrio al Gianicolo in memory of one of his closest and dearest friends. Bonifacio is buried in a beautiful tomb in the Chapel of Saint Sebastiano Martire in the Church of Saint Andrea della Valle in Rome.

The Bevilacqua family exercised a tremendous amount of power within the Catholic Church through Cardinal Bonifacio and his aunt. Countess Isabella Bevilacqua (1519–1589) married Cavaliere Lorenzo Sfondrati, the Patrizio of Cremona. Lorenzo’s brother, Francesco, was made a cardinal by Pope Paul III in 1544. Francesco was a Senator of Milan and when his wife, Sigismonda d’Este, died, he became a cardinal. Francesco’s son, Niccolò, became Pope Gregory XIV on 5 December 1590 and the next year made his nephew Paolo Emilio Sfondrati a cardinal.

== Arts ==
Cardinal Bonifazio was a great patron of the arts. He constructed the Church della Madonna della Neve in Cervia with his relatives the Capponi. The Capponi family built the Church and Monastery of Santo Spirito in Florence in 1360 by Gino Capponi. Gino was famous for conquering Pisa for the Florentines in 1404. His son Neri, whose portrait is done in basso-relief by Simone di Betto in the church, was distinguished in the war of the Florentines against the Duke of Milan, Cosimo de' Medici. His grandson Piero was threatened by Charles VIII of France to surrender or Charles VIII would “sound his trumpets for the final attack”. Piero responded by saying, "Then, we shall sound our bells." Piero Capponi was killed in 1496 in an assault against the Pisans. He was buried in the same tomb as his great-grandfather Gino which is next to the monument of Cardinal Luigi Capponi, a close friend of Cardinal Bonifazio.

Cardinal Bevilacqua was a major patron of Ventura Salimbeni, the son of the Sienese artist Arcangelo Salimbeni (1567–1589), and Battista Focari, widow of Eugenio Vanni. Ventura was first taught painting in his native Siena by his father, as was his half-brother Francesco Vanni. Cardinal Bonifazio introduced Ventura to Pope Sixtus V (1585–90) in 1588. Ventura received his first commission for the fresco decoration of the Biblioteca Apostolica Vaticana (the Vatican Library) by the pope.

During 1590–91, Salimbeni received commissions from Cardinal Bevilacqua to decorate Gesù and Santa Maria Maggiore churches in Rome. In 1595, and the Church of Santa Trinita and the Church of Santa Spirito in Siena utilizing the Mannerist style. Subsequently, Cardinal Bonifacio Bevilacqua commissioned Salimbeni to paint the Betrothal of the Virgin in the diocese’s seminary in Foligno while Bonifazio was governor.

Salimbeni was commissioned to paint Saint Carl Borromeo Adores the Name of Jesus for the cathedral of Saint Lawrence in Grosseto. Cardinal Bevilacqua was a supporter of the cult of the Name of Jesus instituted by Saint Bernardino and sanctioned by Pope Eugene IV in 1432. His next work, Concert of Angels, is stylistically very similar to Betrothal of the Virgin. For almost all of his painting cycles he first created detailed drawings. The few engravings that Salimbeni executed for the cardinal were made in Rome. Of these, only seven survive, dated between 1589 and 1594.

In Perugia, he decorated the Church of San Pietro. After completing his fresco in the church called Cavaleriato del Esperon de Oro, Cardinal Bevilacqua bestowed Ventura Salimbeni with the Bevilacqua family name. From that time, he became known as Il Cavaliere Ventura Salimbeni Bevilacqua. The title of Cavaliere was similar to being knighted. While knighthood was the first and most common of Italy's entitlements, it is not hereditary as are the royal titles. Knighthood is an individual title conferred by members of an Italian royal family for an individual’s outstanding or meritorious service.

In 1612, one year before Salimbeni died, he painted a portrait in celebration of Bonifacio’s elevation to the cardinalate. This is a reference to the letter sent by Pope Clement VIII on 3 April 1598, granting Bonifacio with dispensation for not having reached the canonical age to accept his election by the College of Cardinals to the title of Patriarch of Constantinople. Bonifazio was only 27 years of age; three years younger than the canonical age to be elected a Patriarch.

In 1763, Cardinal Bonifacio’s portrait was incorporated as part of Cardinal Giovanni Maria Riminaldi’s prestigious collection of nineteen portraits of famous cardinals at the Civic Museum of Ferrara in the Schifanoia Palace.
