= Santi Quirico e Giulitta, Siena =

Roman Catholic parish church in Tuscany, Italy

Coordinates: 43.31482°N 11.328003°E

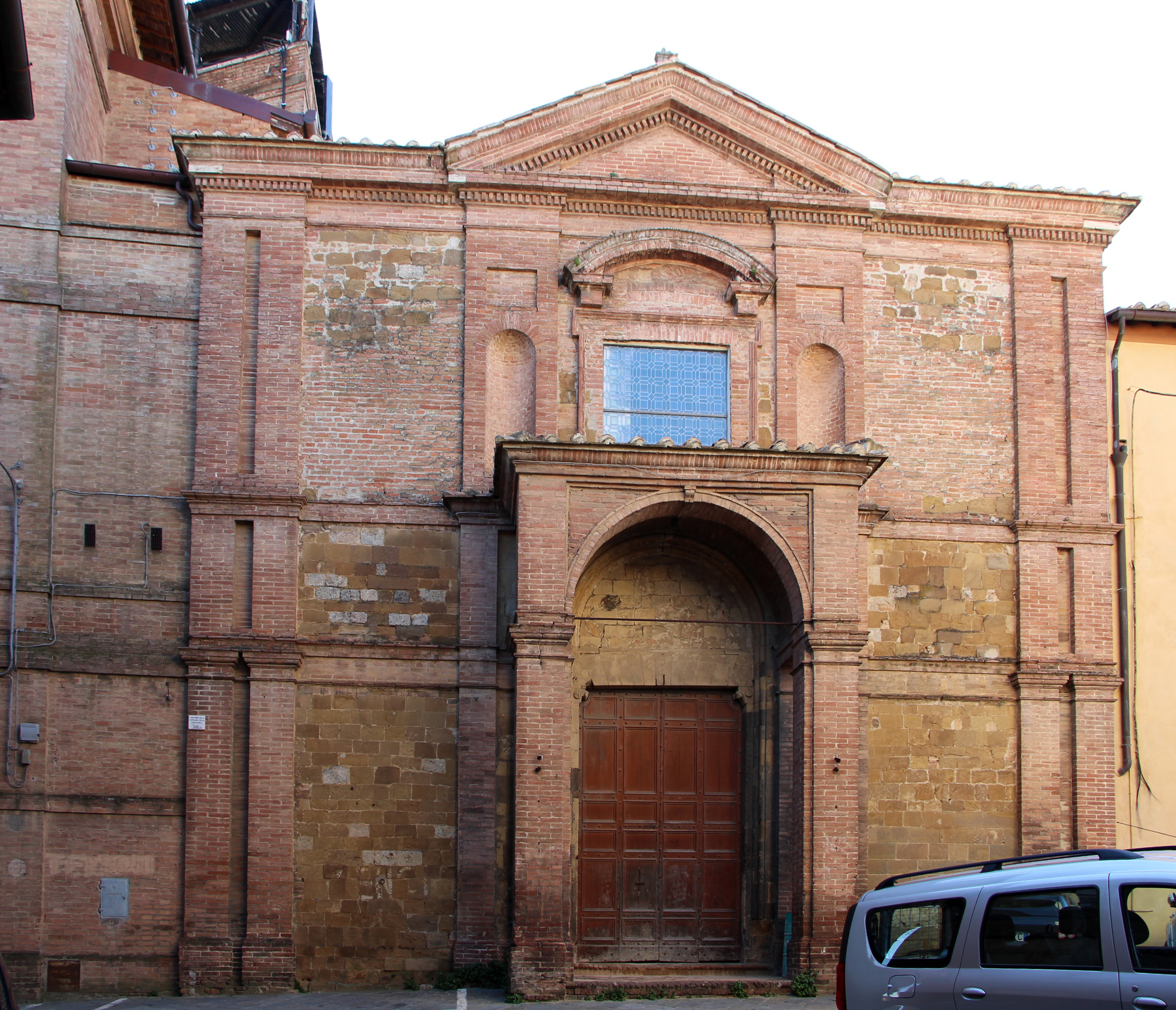
Church of Santi Quirico e Giulitta

Santi Quirico e Giulitta, also called San Quirico in Castelvecchio is a Renaissance style, Roman Catholic parish church located in Pian de Mantellini in the Terzo de Citta of Siena, region of Tuscany, Italy.

== History ==
The church is ancient, putatively founded in the 11th century on the foundations of an earlier pagan temple. It stands now as mostly rebuilt starting in 1598. The portico, and parts of the apse and sacristy retain some of the ancient traces.

The entry lunette was frescoed by Ventura Salimbeni. Above the arch over the presbytery was painted by Stefano Volpi; the imposing Martyrdom of Saints Quriaqos and Julietta in the apse was also painted by Salimbeni. The Prayer in the Garden, Fall of the Rebel Angels, Four prophets and four evangelists in the apse, were painted by Cristoforo Casolani. Mary meets Jesus, Christ at the Column and Repose in Egypt by Francesco Vanni; Deposition by Alessandro Casolani, Christ carries the Cross by Pietro Sorri. Saints Clare, Catherine of Siena, Peter and Paul, and the Angel are by Salimbeni.

Alongside the church is the former Oratory of the Contrada of Pantera, role now played by the church of San Niccolò del Carmine.
