= Domenico Manetti =

Italian painter

- Domenico Manetti, Roman Charity (detail), Siena, Monte dei Paschi Collection
- Born: 8 January 1609; Siena, Grand Duchy of Tuscany
- Died: 22 July 1639 (aged 30); Siena, Grand Duchy of Tuscany
- Education: Rutilio di Lorenzo Manetti
- Known for: Painting
- Movement: Baroque

Domenico Manetti (8 January 1609 – 22 July 1639) was an Italian early-Baroque painter, son of Rutilio di Lorenzo Manetti.

== Biography ==
Domenico Manetti was born in Siena on 8 January 1609. He was the second son of Lisabetta Panducci and Rutilio di Lorenzo Manetti, a highly regarded Mannerist painter active in Siena in the first half of the 17th century. Manetti spent his formative years working alongside his father, remaining faithful to his style throughout his career.

Manetti gradually became his father's principal assistant and collaborated with him on works such as The Visitation and Saints for the church of Sant'Agostino, Massa Marittima, and Rinaldo Abandons Armida (priv. coll., Siena). His influence is even more evident in the Circumcision, created in 1635 for the church of San Romano, Lucca. Manetti also played a significant role in the two large canvases St. Thomas of Villanova Distributing Alms and The Triumph of David, commissioned by the Grand Duke of Tuscany Ferdinando II de' Medici in 1637. He contributed preparatory drawings to Bernardino Capitelli's series of twelve engravings, Stories of St. Bernardino, created in 1635 for Cassiano dal Pozzo's nephew, Ferdinando, and now preserved in the Royal Collection at Windsor Castle.

In addition to his role as Rutilio's primary assistant, Domenico was entrusted with executing several public works in the early 1630s. The earliest of these is arguably the crowded canvas depicting the Ecstasy of St. Jerome for the Sienese church of San Girolamo. Manetti also painted two lunettes depicting episodes from the life of St. Jerome as part of a cycle of frescoes dedicated to the saint in the Sienese oratory of San Girolamo.

On 21 April 1631, Manetti joined the Lay Company of San Giovannino in Pantaneto in Siena. He became its vicar on 11 March 1639. A few months after this appointment, on 26 June, the company's chapter commissioned his father, Rutilio, to paint John the Baptist Pointing to Jesus to the Crowd. Following Rutilio's death less than a month later, Domenico completed the painting.

In 1643, Manetti painted the Multiplication of the Loaves and Fishes for the Sienese church of San Giovanni dei Tredicini. During the same period, Mattias de' Medici, the governor of Siena, commissioned him to paint the allegorical canvas Embrace of Peace and Justice for the Royal Palace of Siena. The following year, Manetti painted Saint Catherine Reciting the Office with Jesus for the Palazzo Pubblico in Siena. In 1644, he completed the Delivery of the Keys for the church of San Pietro in Monsindoli. During the second half of the decade, Manetti painted two frescoes for the Biccherna building in the Palazzo Pubblico: David and the Woman of Thecua in 1646 and Rebecca at the Well in 1649. These works show the influence of Raffaello Vanni's Baroque style. In 1649 Manetti painted Madonna Showing the Image of St. Dominic to Two Saints for the church of Santa Caterina al Paradiso.

In 1651, Manetti contributed two lunettes to the fresco cycle depicting the Stories of Job in the Oratorio di San Rocco in Siena, and created the painting Roman Charity (Siena, Monte dei Paschi). In 1656, he contricuted the Sermon of St Stephen to the series of paintings dedicated to the saint in the church of Santo Stefano in Siena. This project involved some of the most prominent Sienese painters, including Bernardino Mei and Raffaello Vanni. Manetti died in Siena on 17 January 1663.
