= Oratorio di San Rocco, Siena =

Church building in Siena, Italy

Coordinates: 43.323008°N 11.331576°E

Oratorio di San Rocco
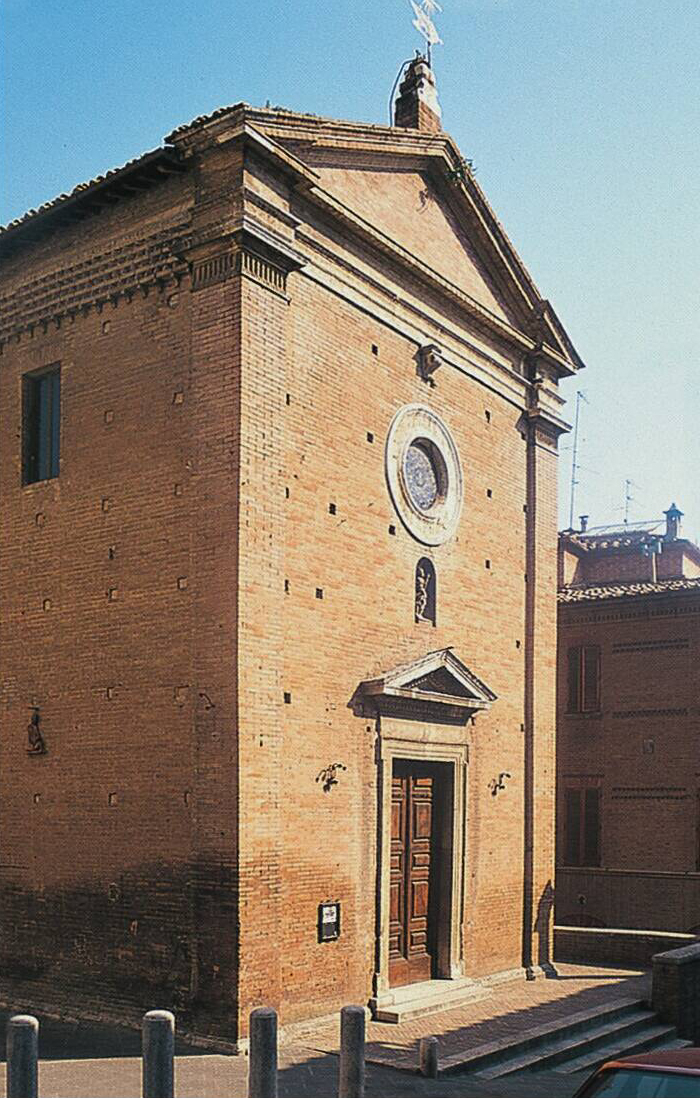

Religion
- Affiliation: Roman Catholic

Location
- Interactive map of Oratorio di San Rocco

Architecture
- Style: Renaissance

The Oratory of San Rocco is a small Roman Catholic prayer hall or oratory, located on via Vallerozzi in Siena, region of Tuscany, Italy.

== History ==
The oratory was initially built by the Confraternity of San Rocco in 1511. The simple two story building has been the property of the Contrada della Lupa, a ward in north Siena, since 1789. The brick façade has an oculus with a 16th-century statue of St Roch, and a travertine marble tympanum.

The interior and the apse are frescoed in the 17th century. The chapel of San Rocco has a 16th-century polychrome terracotta statue of its namesake, and is decorated by frescoes on the Life of St Roch by Crescenzio Gambarelli and Rutilio Manetti. The baptismal font was designed by Giovanni Barsacchi, and is decorated with a she-wolf (Lupa) emblem (1962) by Emilio Montagnani.
