= Stefano Volpi =

Italian painter

Stefano Volpi or Volpe (c. 1585–1642) was an Italian painter from the early Baroque art period, mainly painting sacred subjects in Siena, Italy. According to Luigi Lanzi, he was either a pupil or collaborator with Rutilio Manetti. Among his works are paintings in the churches of Santi Quirico e Giulitta, San Raimondo, San Sebastiano and San Domenico in Siena.
