= Order of the Golden Spur =

Papal order of knighthood

Order of the Golden Spur Ordo Militiae Auratae
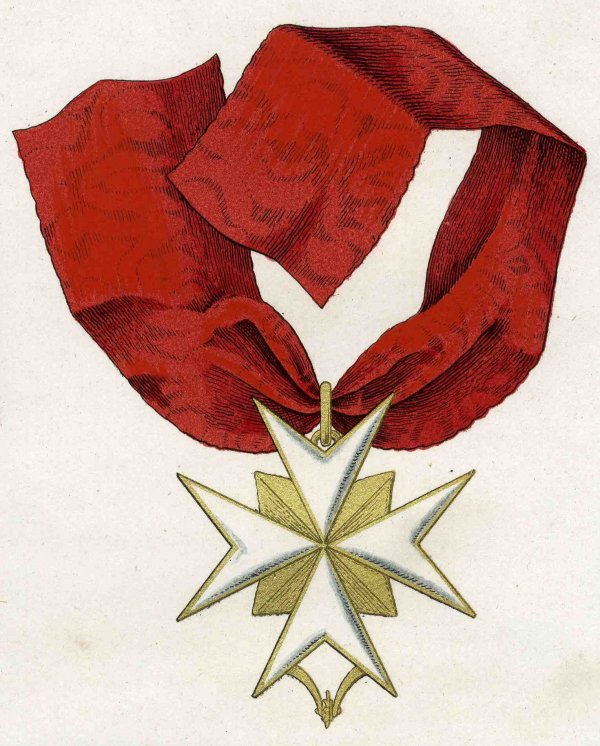
- Badge of the order

Awarded by Holy See
- Type: Papal order of knighthood
- Status: Dormant order
- Sovereign: Pope Leo XIV
- Grades: Knight

Precedence
- Next (higher): Supreme Order of Christ
- Next (lower): Order of Pius IX
- Ribbon bar of the order

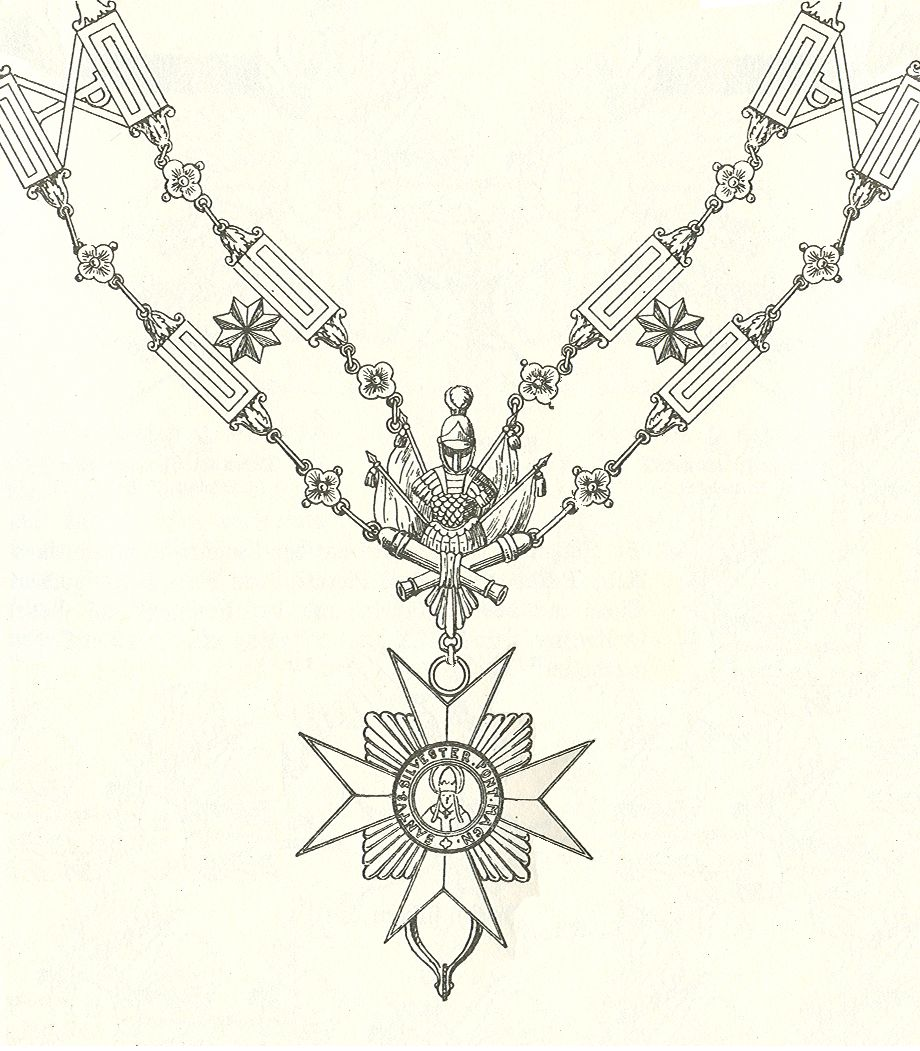
Collar of the Order of Saint Sylvester and the Golden Militia prior to 1905

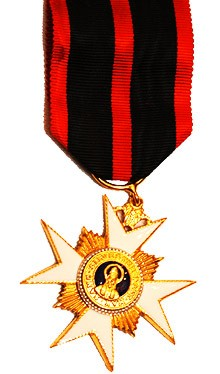
Cross of the Order of Saint Sylvester and the Golden Militia, 1841

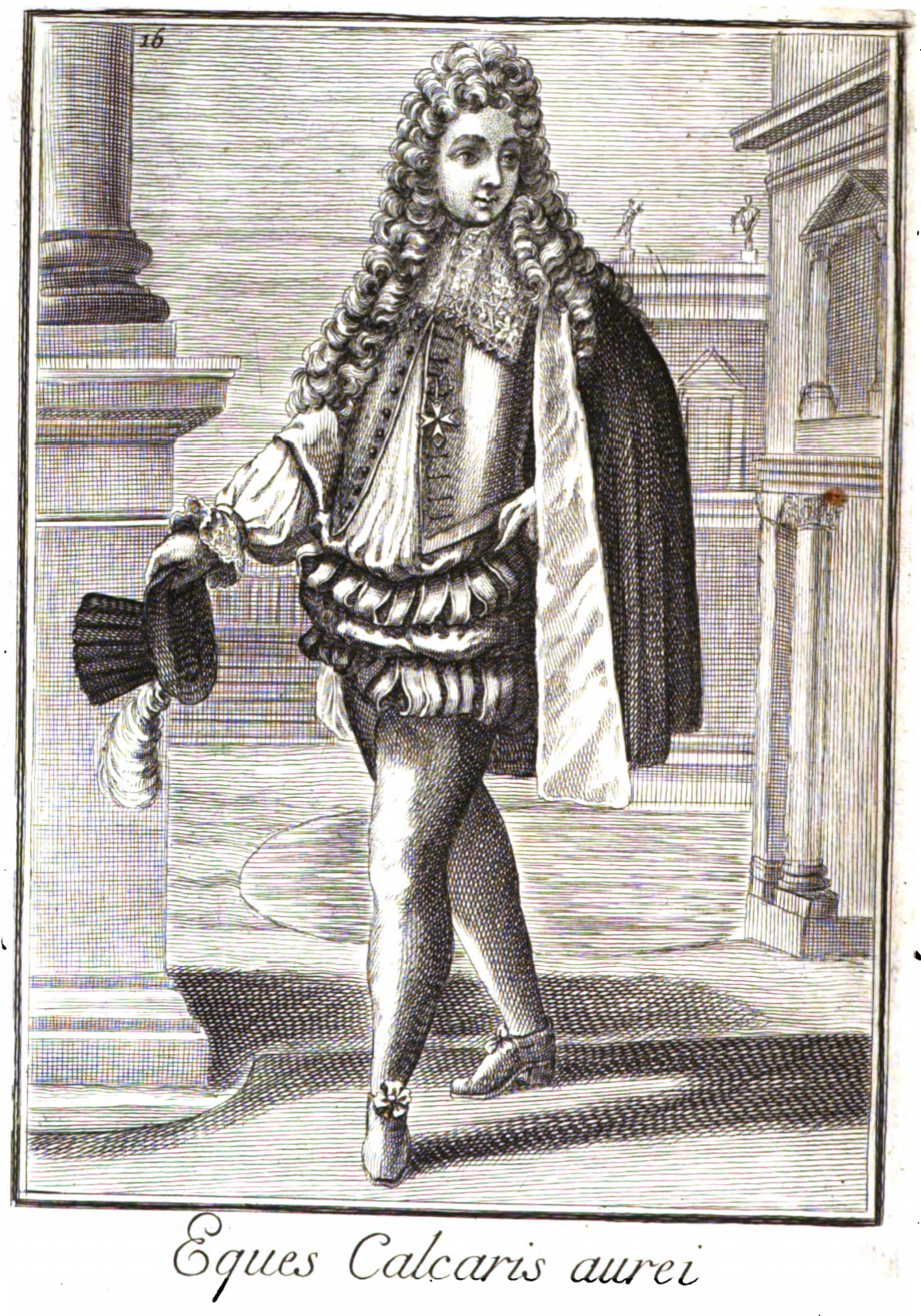

The Order of the Golden Spur (Italian: Ordine dello Speron d'oro, French: Ordre de l'Éperon d'or), officially known also as the Order of the Golden Militia (Latin: Ordo Militia Aurata, Italian: Milizia Aurata), is a papal order of knighthood conferred upon those who have rendered distinguished service in propagating the Catholic faith, or who have contributed to the glory of the Church, either by feat of arms, by writings, or by other illustrious acts. With the death in 2019 of the last remaining knight, Grand Duke Jean of Luxembourg, the order is considered dormant.

== History ==
=== Before 19th century: a noble order ===
It is accounted the earliest papal chivalric institution. The Order of the Golden Spur had its origins in the title Count palatine of the Lateran Palace, which was in the gift of the Holy Roman Emperor in the fourteenth century: Charles IV, Holy Roman Emperor conferred the title on one Fenzio di Albertino di Prato, 15 August 1357, at Prague. The Order began to be associated with the inheritable patent of nobility in the form of count palatinate during the Renaissance; Emperor Frederick III named Baldo Bartolini, professor of civil law at the University of Perugia, a count palatinate in 1469, entitled in turn to confer university degrees. "Bartolini also received the Knighthood of the Golden Spur, a title that sometimes accompanied the office of count palatinate in the Renaissance", according to the historian of universities Paul F. Grendler; the Order of the Golden Spur, linked with the title of count palatinate, was widely conferred after the Sack of Rome, 1527, by Charles V, Holy Roman Emperor; the text of surviving diplomas conferred hereditary nobility to the recipients. Among the recipients was Titian (1533), who had painted an equestrian portrait of Charles. Close on the heels of the Emperor's death in 1558, its refounding in Papal hands is attributed to Pope Pius IV in 1559.

By the mid-18th century the Order was being so indiscriminately bestowed that Casanova remarked "The Order they call the Golden Spur was so disparaged that people irritated me greatly when they asked me the details of my cross;" he had the grace to add that he would have been pleased if he had been able to answer "mon Toison", and he did habitually wear it, nevertheless, on its scarlet riband. In 1777 Wolfgang Amadeus Mozart had his portrait painted with the star-encircled cross of the order on his coat, and the Order granted to Giovanni Battista Piranesi permitted him to sign his etchings Cav. G.B. Piranesi. The Order was granted to "those in the pontifical government, artists, and others, whom the pope should think deserving of reward. It is likewise given to strangers, no other condition being required, but that of professing the catholic religion."

=== 19th century: decline of the order ===
In the 19th century, members of the Curia, prelates and papal nuncios had the privilege of nominating recipients. The Order was given out liberally upon payment of a small fee, and some scandal arose in Paris concerning the sale of forged letters patent claiming to confer this title, formerly linked with the purely honorary designation Count Palatine of the Sacred Palace of the Lateran. Honoré Daumier included the "Knight of the Golden Spur" among his series of lithographs "Bohemians of Paris" (1842); its satirically mocking legend reads "This so-called former Colonel of the Papal Guard, later aide-de-camp to the Prince of Monaco, awaiting as a prize for his services a distinguished post in the Government!... he would, however, willingly accept a tobacconist's shop or a position as an inspector of [street] sweeping; besides, he is a gallant man like all knights of his order, for a trifle demanding satisfaction from five-year-old children, perfectly making excuses from the moment you look at him in the face."

The badge, as described by Robson in 1830, was an eight-pointed gold cross with a ray point between each arm and the legend BENE MER•ENTI. On the reverse was Ex dono with the name and date when presented. On top of the cross, an imperial crown, and at the base a small spur.

In 1841, Pope Gregory XVI, in the Papal Brief Quod Hominum Mentes, reformed and renamed the order as the Order of Saint Sylvester and the Golden Militia. He withdrew all faculties to whom and by whomsoever given, and forbade the use of the title or the decoration to all knights created by any means other than a Papal Brief. To restore the Order to its ancient glory, he limited the number of Commanders to 150 and knights to 300 (for the Papal States only), and appointed the Cardinal of Apostolic Briefs as Chancellor of the Order, with the duty of preserving the name, grade, number and date of admission of each knight.

=== 20th century till present ===
On 7 February 1905, in commemoration of the golden jubilee of the dogmatic definition of the Immaculate Conception, Pope Pius X in his motu proprio Multum ad excitandos, divided the order into two, one taking the name of Order of St. Sylvester and the other taking the older name of the Order of the Golden Spur, and placed it under the patronage of the Blessed Virgin Mary. In modern times the order has only one class, Knight, and its membership has been restricted to one hundred knights throughout the world. The honour is conferred by a Motu Proprio of the Pope. It is used to award merit, without any consideration of noble birth, and no longer confers nobility, as it did before 1841. It is the second highest of the papal orders (the first being the Supreme Order of Christ).

With the death of Grand Duke Jean of Luxembourg on 23 April 2019, there are no living members of the Order of the Golden Spur.

== Insignia ==
The emblems of the order after the 1905 reorganization consists of:

- The badge, an eight-pointed, enamelled gold cross, in whose center is a small white medallion on one side of which is the word "Maria" surrounded by a golden circle, and on the other the year MDCCCCV and in its surrounding circle the words "Pius X Restituit". Pendant from the bottom of the cross is a small golden spur. The decoration is suspended from a red ribbon with white borders.
- The star, which is worn on the left breast, is the same cross centered upon the rays of a silver star.

The official uniform is a red tunic decorated with two rows of gilt buttons, black velvet collar and cuffs embroidered in gold, black trousers with gold side stripes, epaulettes ornamented with gold fringes and surmounted on top with the emblem of the order, gold spurs, oblong two-peaked hat trimmed with gold and bearing the papal colors, and a sword whose hilt forms a gilt cross in a black scabbard, held in place with a gold sword belt with red fringe.

In the early days of the order its members were entitled to wear a gold livery collar (chain), but when the order was revived in 1905 this was not resumed, though the collar remains a symbol of the order.

In ecclesiastical heraldry, individuals awarded this Order may depict the gold livery collar completely encircling the shield on their coat of arms.

== Notable recipients ==
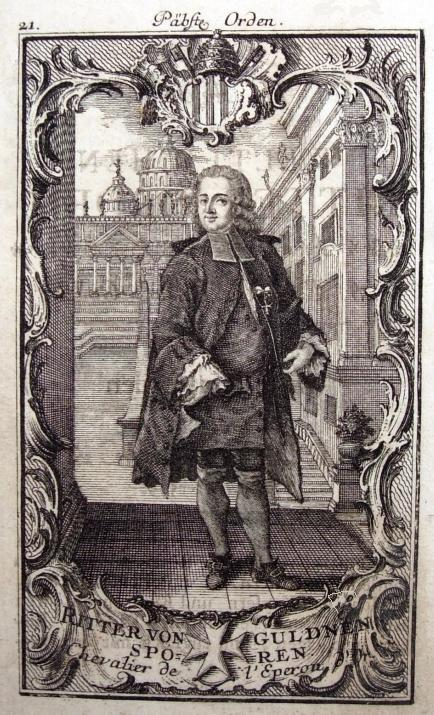
A Papal Knight of the Golden Spur, copper engraving by Jacob Andreas Fridrich, 1756

- Diego García de Paredes (1466–1534), Spanish soldier
- Raphael (1483–1520), artist
- Giorgio Vasari (1511–1574), artist and biographer
- Orlande de Lassus (1532-1594), composer, conferred by Pope Gregory XIII
- Domenico Fontana (1543 – 28 June 1607)
- Giorgio Basta (1544–1607), conferred by Rudolf II
- Ventura Salimbeni (1568–1613), Sienese Mannerist painter and printmaker
- Bonifazio Bevilacqua Aldobrandini (1571–1627), Italian Cardinal and uncle of Pope Gregory XIV
- Nicholas Plunkett (1602–1680), Irish lawyer and Confederate leader
- Antonio Latini (1642–1692), steward to Cardinal Antonio Barberini, cardinal-nephew of Pope Urban VIII
- Christoph Willibald Gluck (1714–1787), German classical composer
- Anton Raaff (1714–1797), tenor, conferred by Pope Pius VI
- Bartolomeo Cavaceppi (c. 1716–1799), Italian sculptor
- Giacomo Casanova (1725–1798), adventurer
- Giovanni Gallini (1729–1805), dancer and impresario in London 1760–1800
- Jean-François Fournel (1745–1820), French lawyer and jurist
- Georg Joseph Vogler (1749–1814), German composer, conferred by Pope Clement XIV
- Wolfgang Amadeus Mozart (1756–1791), classical composer, at the age of fourteen
- Niccolò Paganini (1782–1840), Italian violinist, violist, guitarist, and composer
- Miklós Horthy (1868–1957), Regent of the Kingdom of Hungary (1920–1944)
- Benito Mussolini (1883–1945)
- Prince Paul of Yugoslavia (1893–1976), Regent of the Kingdom of Yugoslavia (1934–1941)
- Sukarno (1901–1970), President of Indonesia
- Mohammad Reza Pahlavi (1919–1980), Shah of Iran
- Jean, Grand Duke of Luxembourg (1921–2019)
- Hussein bin Talal (1935–1999), King of Jordan (1952–1999)

== See also ==
- Orders, decorations, and medals of the Holy See
