= San Lorenzo in San Pietro, Montalcino =

Church building in Tuscany, Italy

Coordinates: 43°03′34.86″N 11°29′25.97″E

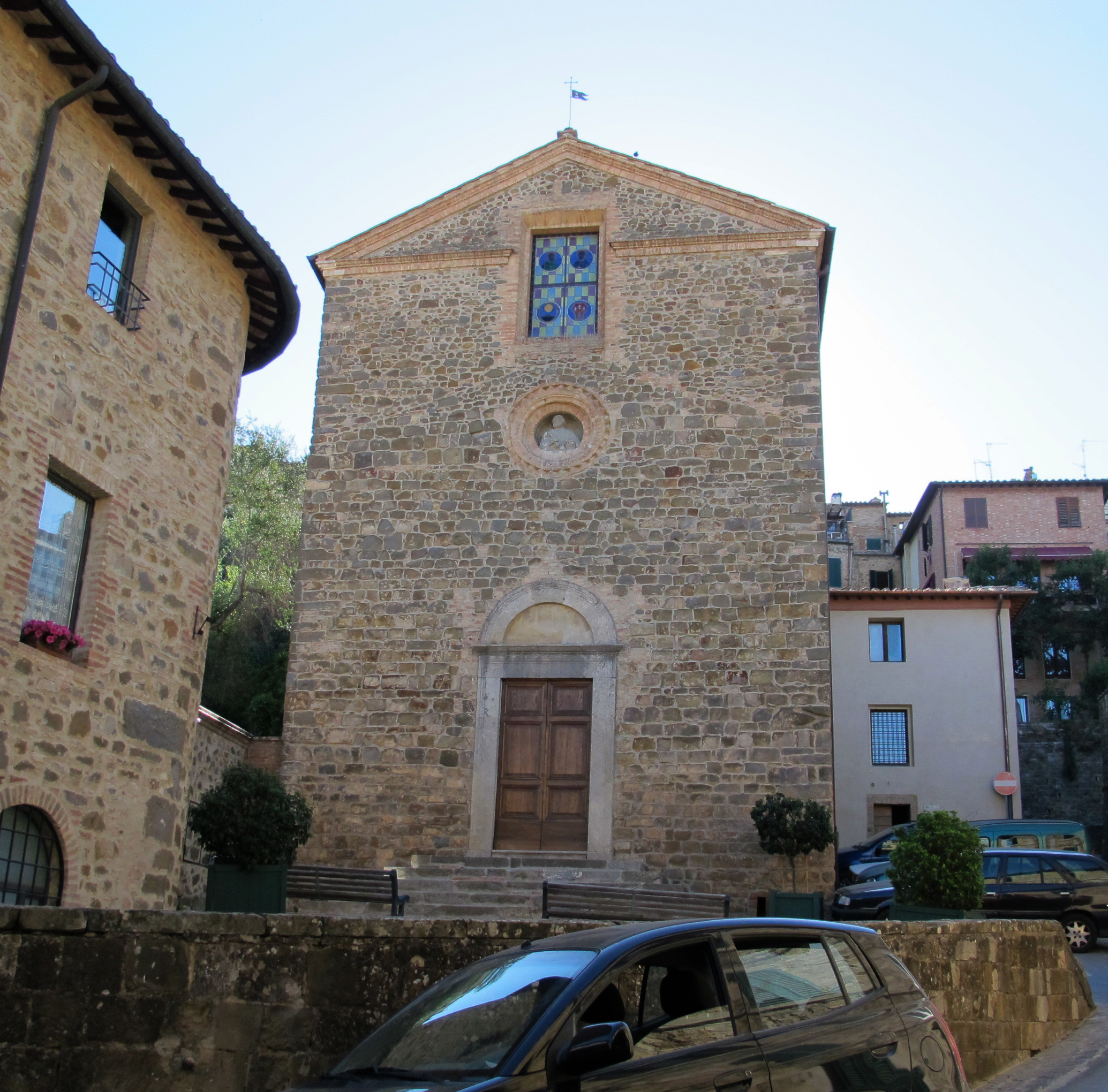
Facade of church.

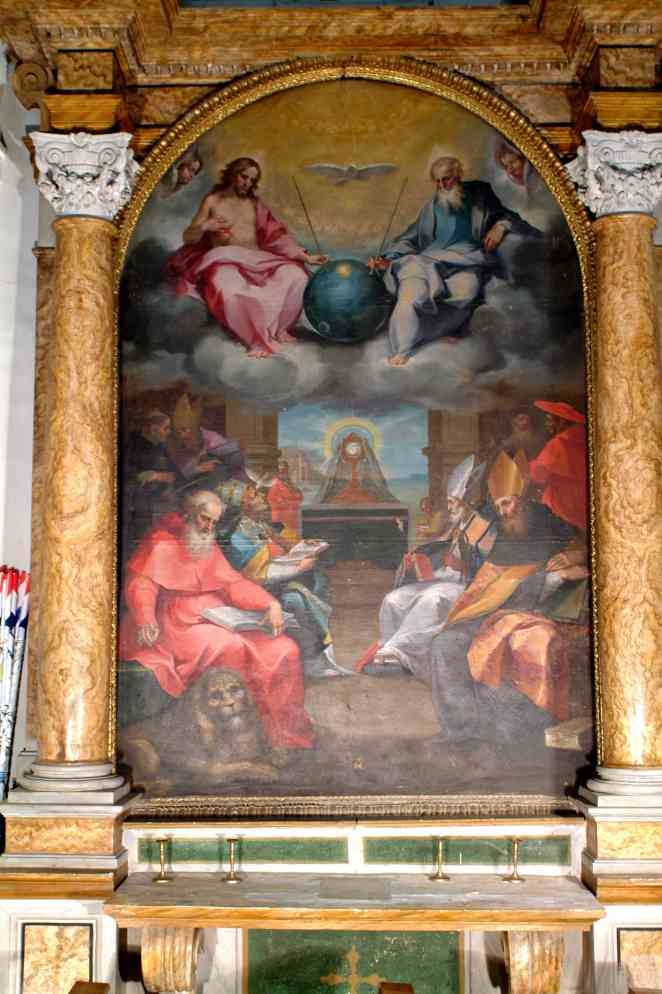
Salimbeni altarpiece

San Lorenzo in San Pietro is a Romanesque-style, Roman Catholic, parish church in Montalcino, region of Tuscany, Italy.

The church has a notable painting depicting the Glorification of the Eucharist by Ventura Salimbeni depicting God the Father and Jesus with wands on an astronomical depiction of the globe encompassing the universe.
