= Ilario Casolano =

Italian painter

Ilario Casolano (1588 – 14 May 1661) was an Italian painter of the Baroque period.

He was called Cristofano Casolano by Giovanni Baglione. He was, like his father, Alessandro Casolano, was a pupil of Cavalière Cristoforo Roncalli. He assisted his father in some of his frescoes, and after his death, finished the fresco of the Assumption of the Virgin. He painted several pictures for the churches in Rome. The church of Santa Maria in Via Lata contains a Trinity, while the church of Santa Maria ai Monti has some pictures from the Life of the Virgin and an Assumption. He died at Rome.

== Works ==
- Assumption of the Virgin, fresco
- Trinity, Santa Maria in Via Lata church, Rome
- Life of a Virgin and Assumption, Santa Maria dei Monti church, Rome
- Annunciation, parish church, Montieri
- Annunciation (1630), San Francesco (St. Francis) Basilica, Siena
- View of the City of Grosseto, Grosseto Cathedral
