= Arcangelo Salimbeni =

Italian Mannerist painter

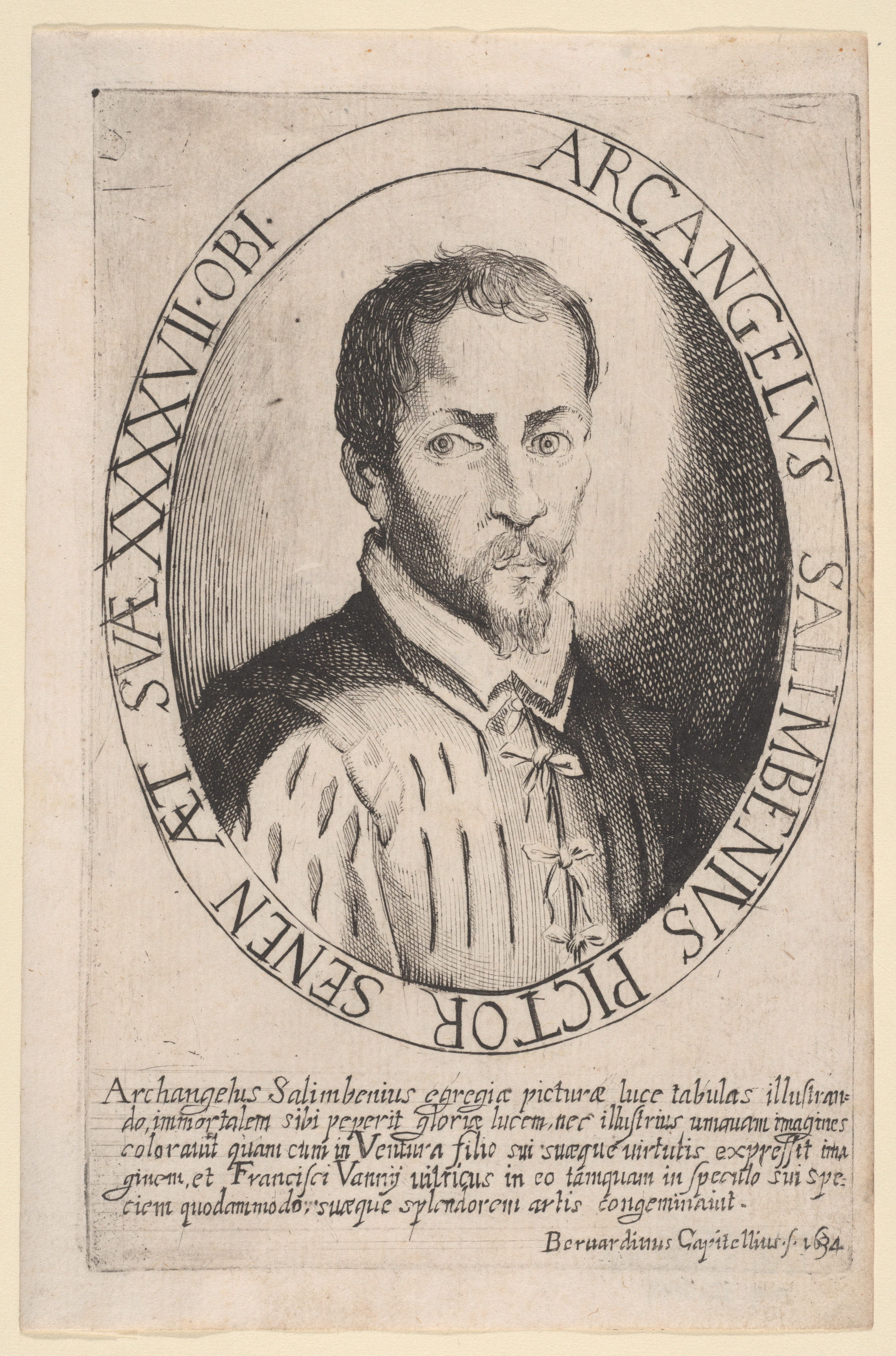
Portrait of Arcangelo Salimbeni, 1634 by Bernardino Capitelli, Metropolitan Museum of Art

Arcangelo Salimbeni (circa 1536 –1579) was an Italian painter of the Renaissance period active in his native Siena, Italy. He was the father of the painter Ventura Salimbeni, stepfather of Francesco Vanni, and son of Leonardo. He was a follower of Domenico Beccafumi and Il Sodoma, and influenced by Federico Zuccaro. He painted in a delicate, often diaphanous Mannerist style.
