= Ventura Salimbeni =

Italian painter (1568–1613)

- Self-portrait in the Uffizi, Florence, c. 1605
- Born: Alessandro Salimbeni; 20 January 1568; Siena, Duchy of Florence
- Died: 23 November 1613 (aged 45); Siena, Grand Duchy of Tuscany
- Known for: Painting
- Movement: Counter-Maniera

Ventura di Arcangelo Salimbeni (also later called Bevilacqua; 20 January 1568 – 23 November 1613) was an Italian Counter-Maniera painter and printmaker highly influenced by the vaghezza and sensual reform of Federico Barocci.

== Biography ==
=== Early life and work in Rome ===
Ventura Salimbeni was born in Siena on 20 January 1568, to Arcangelo Salimbeni and Battista Focari. He was first taught painting in his native Siena by his father, as was his half-brother Francesco Vanni, with whom he was often confused. Ventura possibly spent some time in North Italy before going to Rome, where he worked from 1588, collaborating on the fresco decoration of the Vatican Library during the reign of Pope Sixtus V.

During 1590-1591, Salimbeni received a commission from Cardinal Bonifazio Bevilacqua Aldobrandini for paintings in the Roman Jesuit Church of the Gesù and the Basilica di Santa Maria Maggiore. These paintings reflect the influence of the Cavaliere d’ Arpino, Cherubino Alberti and Andrea Lilio. Between 1589 and 1594, Salimbeni also produced some etchings in Rome, seven of which survive. They are among the finest Italian prints of the period. The earliest dated, and the largest, is the Baptism of Christ of 1589, which he produced in collaboration with the more experienced Ambrogio Brambilla.

=== Mature work ===
Preparatory drawing for Salimbeni's Birth of the Virgin, pen and brown and red ink over red chalk, National Gallery of Art, Washington, D.C.

Salimbeni returned to Siena in 1595. Here he persisted in a Reformist or Counter-Maniera style. The influence of Federico Barocci can be seen in the draperies, highlighted with abrupt changes of light and flickering surfaces, of his painting Birth of the Virgin in San Domenico, Ferrara (1607–1608). Salimbeni became one of the leading personalities in Sienese art in the transitional period between Mannerism and Baroque. The decoration (1595–1602) of the oratory of the Santa Trinità, Siena, is one of his most outstanding achievements. Angels, apostles, virgins, saints, monks and Doctors of the Church fill the vaulted area, while interspersed among them are 12 scenes from the Apocalypse (two by his pupil Alessandro Casolani). A series of detailed preparatory drawings in chalk and ink wash has survived in connection with this project, most of which are now in the Uffizi in Florence or the Fine Arts Museum of San Francisco.

Around 1600, Salimbeni painted the scenes from the Life of St. Hyacinth in Santo Spirito, Siena. The scenes from the popular legend are inserted into a rich backdrop of buildings and landscape and reveal Salimbeni’s assimilation of the Mannerism of Domenico Beccafumi and of the Florentine Reformers Cigoli and Domenico Passignano. Preparatory studies exist (Florence, Uffizi) for St. Hyacinth Healing the Blind Twins. The frescoes in the vault of the chapel of San Massimino in Santa Maria degli Angeli, Assisi, were also painted around 1600 and include the Investiture and Death of St. Clare and the Ascension, which has an illusionistically painted balustrade (preparatory drawing, Florence, Uffizi). In 1603 Salimbeni frescoed Santi Quirico e Giulitta, one of the oldest churches in Siena, with scenes from the lives of the church’s patron saints Cyricus and Julitta (preparatory drawing, Florence, Uffizi). Salimbeni executed three paintings, the Donation of the Keys (1599), the Glorification of the Eucharist (1600) and the Crucifixion (1604) for San Lorenzo in San Pietro in Montalcino.

=== Later career ===
Around 1600 Salimbeni was also working in Perugia, where the papal legate, Cardinal Bonifazio Bevilacqua Aldobrandini, commissioned two paintings for the basilica of San Pietro, the Vision of Gregory the Great, which has an interesting diagonal composition, and the Punishment of David (preparatory drawing, Florence, Uffizi). Bevilacqua invested Salimbeni with the Order of the Golden Spur, a very selective papal order, and authorized him to use his name.

Between 1605 and 1608 Salimbeni frescoed lunettes (1605–1608) illustrating events in the history of the Servite Order at the Basilica della Santissima Annunziata, Florence, and in 1606–7 executed the canvas of the Ascension of the Virgin for San Frediano, Pisa. Salimbeni is recorded in Genoa in 1610–11, the years in which he also executed his most important commission in Siena, the two large frescoes for the cathedral apse, depicting the Gathering of Manna and Esther before Ahasuerus, notable for the skill with which he handled the large number of figures and the distant landscape and buildings. Salimbeni’s talent is shown to greater effect, however, in the small intimate scenes from the Life of St. Galganus (1612; Chiesa del Santuccio). The fairy-tale, wooded landscapes create the perfect atmosphere for the Tuscan knight and saint who became a hermit.

In Salimbeni’s final painting, the Marriage of the Virgin ( 1613; Foligno, Seminario Diocesano), he once again demonstrated his links with Mannerism, of which he was the last great representative in Siena after Beccafumi. Ventura died on 23 November 1613 after completing the Adoration of the Shepherds, which had been left unfinished by Casolani, for the church of Sant’Agostino. He was buried in San Niccolò al Carmine, Siena.

== Anthology of works ==
Particular from Salimbeni's The Trinity with Saint Peter and Saint Bernardino of Siena, late 16th century, oil on canvas, 158 x 115 cm, Musée Fesch, Ajaccio

- St. Agnes (1590, etching, De Young Museum, San Francisco, California)
- The Annunciation (1594, drawing, De Young Museum)
- Marriage of the Virgin (1590 De Young Museum)
- Two Studies of a Female (De Young Museum)
- Figure Studies of a Man and a Seated Woman (De Young Museum)
- Studies of a Male Figure with a Sword (De Young Museum)
- Madonna and Child (De Young Museum)
- Figure Studies of a Man and a Standing Woman (De Young Museum)
- Joachim and Anna (1590, etching, De Young Museum)
- The Annunciation (Museum of Fine Arts, Budapest)
- Death of St Claire with Pope Innocent IV's blessing, drawing Fitzwilliam Museum, Cambridge, UK
- Christ on the Cross with Virgin, Magdalen, & Saint John (Courtauld Institute of Art, London)
- Two studies of the head of a woman, and sketch of a foot (Courtauld Institute of Art, London)
- Youth kneeling holding a vase (Courtauld Institute of Art, London)
- Marriage of the Virgin (Diocesan Seminary, Foligno)
- The Virgin and Child in Glory, (1590 Grand Rapids Art Museum, Michigan)
- Trinity with St.Peter and St. Bernard, (Musée Fesch, Ajaccio, Corsica)
- Study for an Altarpiece (drawing, Fogg Art Museum, Boston, MA)
- Saint Caterina acceca con lo sguardo and Florentine Soldiers (Haarlem, Teylers Museum)
- Saint Lorenzo and Saint Charles Borromeo Pray to the Name of Jesus(1620, San Lorenzo of Grosseto).
- Frescoes of Christ’ Resurrection (Bagno Vignoni)
- Depiction of Ventura Salimbeni (Bernardino Capitelli, 1634)
- Fresco of the Trinity at work with globe (Montalcino)
- Resurrection of Christ in the Chapel of the removal of the Lord in the Basilica of Santa Maria degli Angeli in Assisi, Italy.

== Bibliography ==
- Sydney J., Freedberg (1993). Painting in Italy, 1500-1600. Pelican History of Art (3 ed.). London: Penguin Books.
