= Bernardino Capitelli =

Italian painter

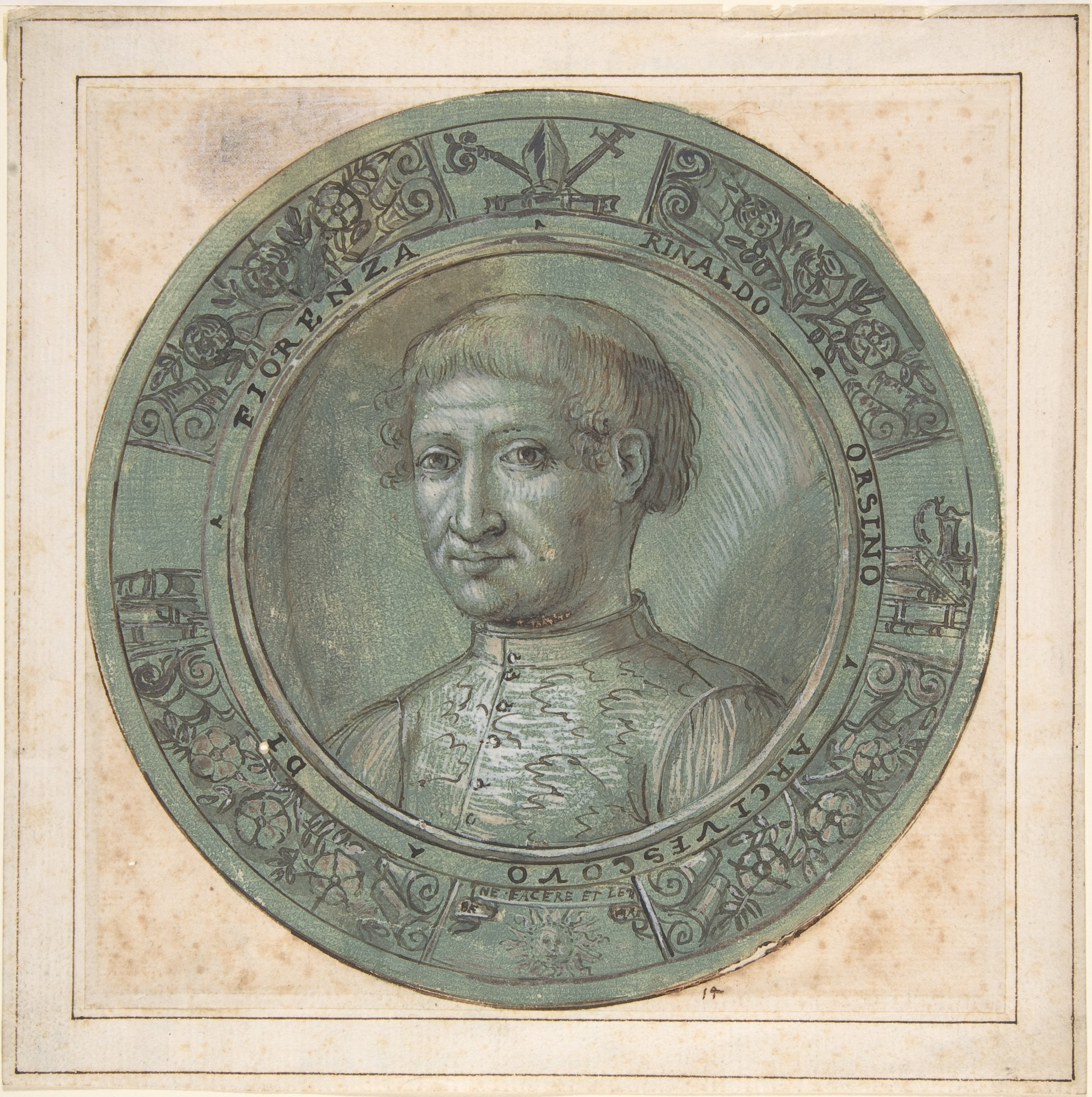
Portrait of Rinaldo Orsino, Archbishop of Florence (1474–1508), pen and ink, wash, gouache and chalk on green paper

Bernardino Capitelli (1589–1639) was an Italian painter and etcher of the Baroque period.

He was born in Siena. He became a pupil of Alessandro Casolani, and then of Rutilio Manetti, and between the years 1622 and 1637 was active in both at Rome and at Siena. Among his etchings are a Portrait of Alessandro Casolani, a St. Anthony of Padua (1637), a Marriage of St. Catharine after Correggio, a nocturnal Repose in Egypt after Rutilio Manetti, a Lot and his Daughters after Manetti. He also made a Ceres drinking in the Cottage of the old and a set of twelve plates of the Life of St. Bernard of Siena. He also etched a set of friezes and basso-relievi, among them, the Aldobrandini Marriage from an antique painting.

Capitelli overcame his shortcomings as a draughtsman and achieved the unique position of virtually the only tenebrist etcher in Italy. The use of abrupt contrasts of light and dark is characteristic of Capitelli's work.
