= Alessandro Casolani =

Italian painter (1552–1606)

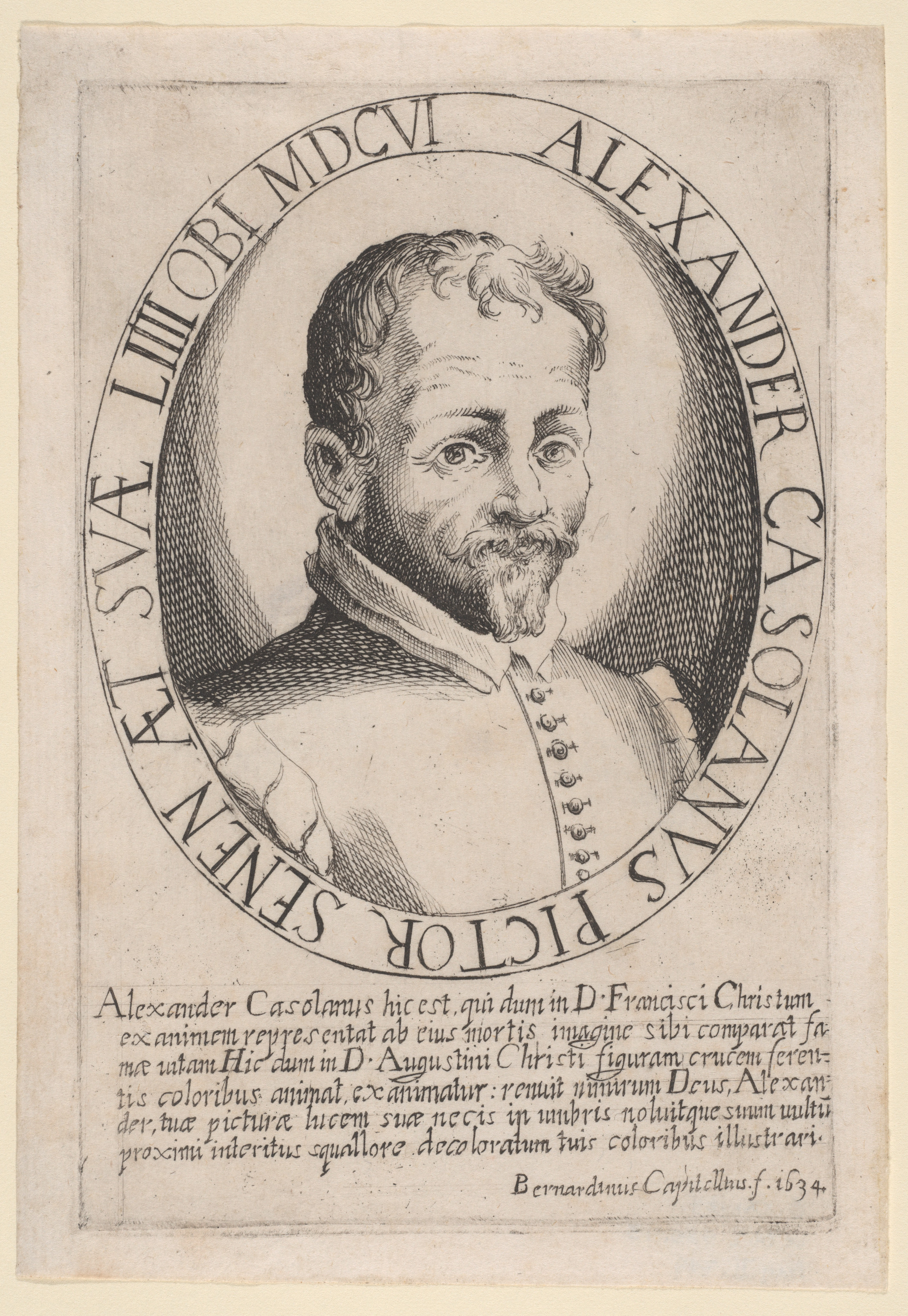
Portrait of Alessandro Casolani, 1634 by Bernardino Capitelli, Metropolitan Museum of Art

Alessandro Casolani (1552–1606), also called Alessandro della Torre, was an Italian painter of the late-Renaissance period, active mainly in Siena.

Casolani was born at Siena in 1552, and was the pupil of Ventura Salimbeni and of Cristoforo Roncalli. His works are principally in the churches of Siena, but are also found in Naples and Genoa. He also etched one plate, a Madonna. His son, Ilario Casolani was also a painter. Among the pupils of Casolani are Bernardino Capitelli, Sebastiano Folli, and Giovanni Biliverti.

== Works ==
- Frescoes at Certosa di Pavia with Pietro Sorri
