= Francesco Vanni =

Italian painter (1563–1610)

Francesco Vanni (c. 1772-80), by Giuseppe Macpherson

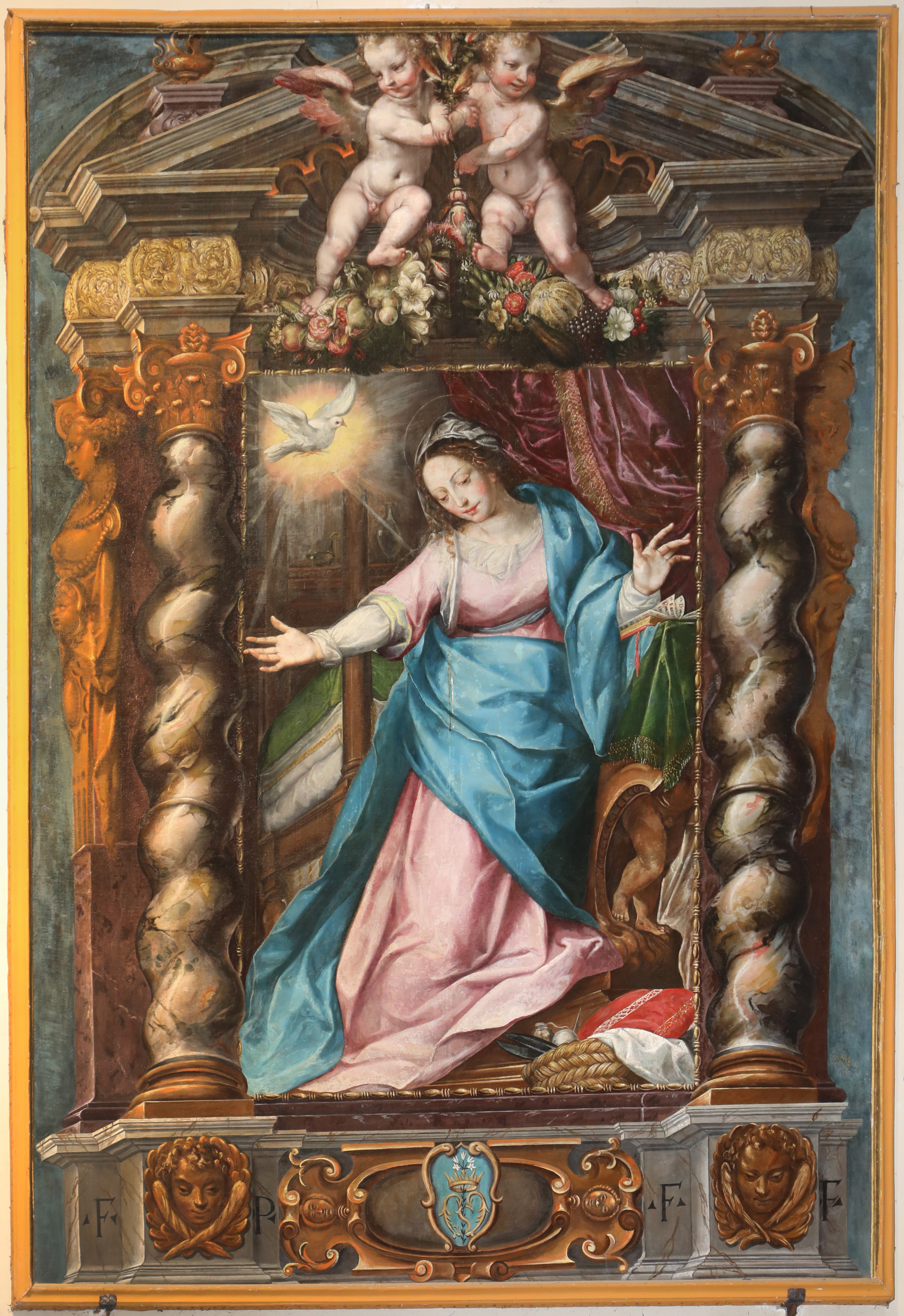
Annunciation of the Virgin

Francesco Vanni (1563 – 26 October 1610) was an Italian painter, draughtsman, printmaker, publisher and printer active in Rome and his native city of Siena.

== Biography ==
Vanni was part of a family of painters, including his half-brother Ventura Salimbeni and stepfather Arcangelo Salimbeni, the latter of whom died when Francesco was young. As a 16-year-old, Vanni went first to Bologna, then to Rome. He apprenticed with Giovanni de' Vecchi during 1579–80, also being influenced, like other Tuscan painters of his day, by Federico Barocci from Urbino. Vanni was among the last painters who reflected the influence of the Sienese School of painting.

In Rome, he worked later with Salimbeni, Bartolomeo Passerotti, and Andrea Lilio. Among his patrons was Cardinal Cesare Baronio, who introduced Vanni to Pope Clement VIII and later Cardinal Chigi, later Pope Alexander VII. Pope Clement VIII would honor Vanni with membership in the order of Knights of Christ. This pope also commissioned Vanni to paint the altarpiece depicting Simon Magus rebuked by St. Peter for the St. Peter's, later transferred to mosaic. He painted several other major altarpieces in Rome including aSt Michael defeats rebel angels for the sacristy of San Gregorio; a Pietà for Santa Maria in Vallicella; and the Assumption for San Lorenzo in Miranda.

Returning to Siena, where he ultimately died, he afterwards worked at Parma, Bologna, and again at Rome. At Siena, he painted a S. Raimondo walking on the Sea for the church of the Dominicans. Vanni painted a Baptism of Constantine (1586–87) for the church of San Agostino in Siena. He painted a Christ appearing to St. Catherine for the chapel of il Refugio at the Sanctuary of Santa Caterina di Siena, and a Baptism (1587) for the former church of San Giovannino e Gennaro, Siena. He painted an Immaculate Conception (1588) for the Montalcino Cathedral and an Annunciation (1589) for the church of Santa Maria dei Servi in Siena. He painted a "Crucifixion with Father Matteo Guerra" for San Giorgio.

He was active as a printmaker and etched three devotional prints after his own designs. He was further the publisher of a large 4-plate map of Siena which he had designed himself and had engraved by the Flemish engraver Pieter de Jode the Elder. He applied in 1595 to Lorenzo Usimbardi for help in obtaining financial support in the publication of the map.

His sons, Michelangelo and Raffaello Vanni were also painters. Among his pupils were Astolfo Petrazzi and Rutilio Manetti. The painter from Perugia, Benedetto Bandieri, claimed to be a descendant of Vanni.

== Gallery ==
Selected works

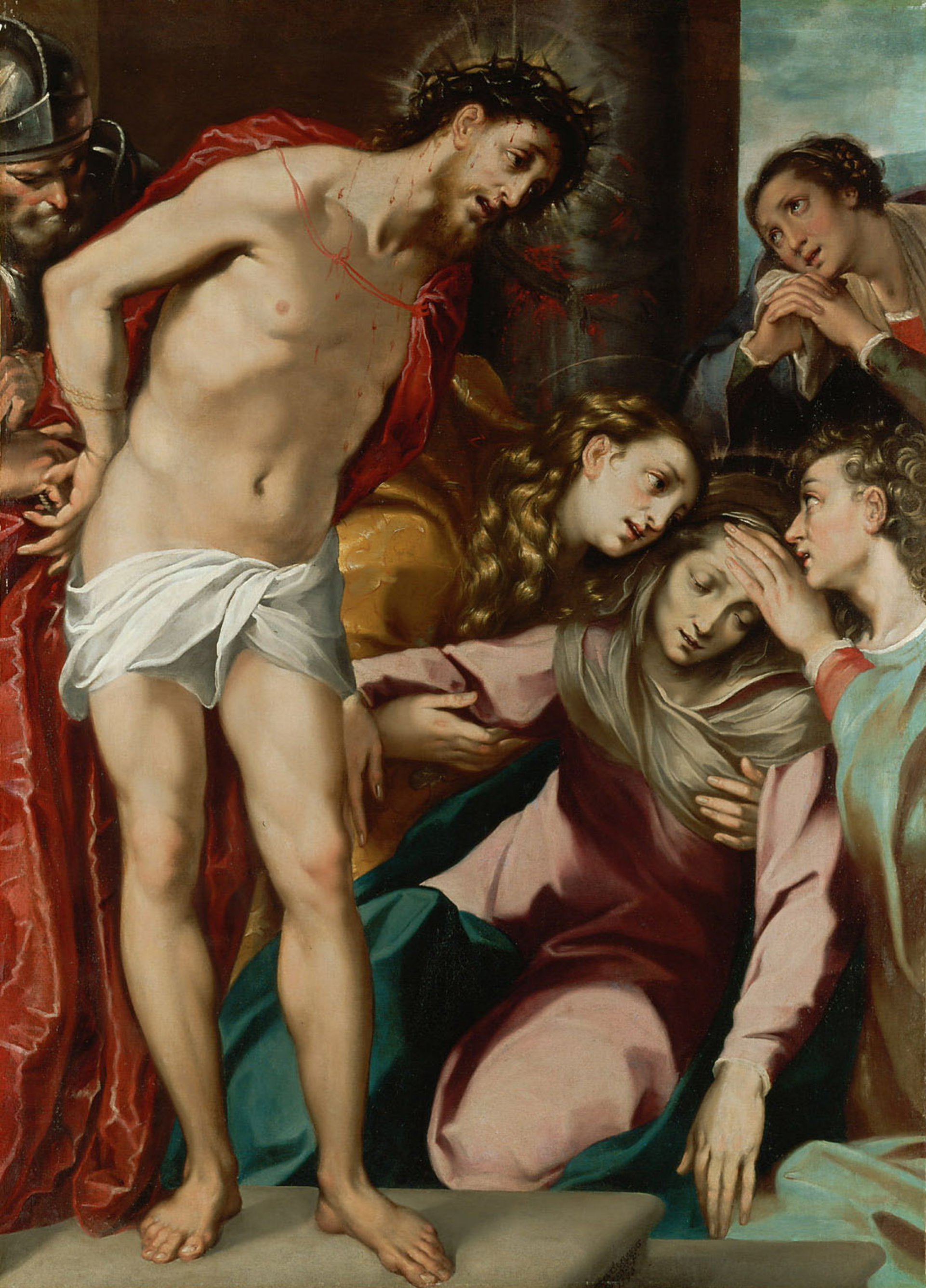
The Flagellation of Christ, Kunsthistorisches Museum, Vienna

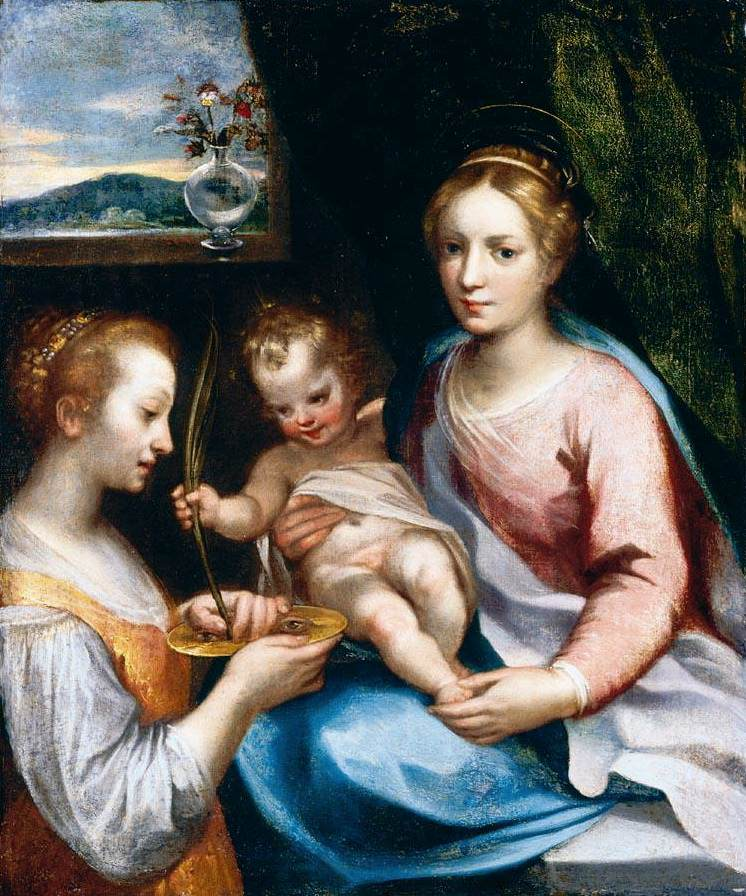
Madonna and Child with St. Lucy

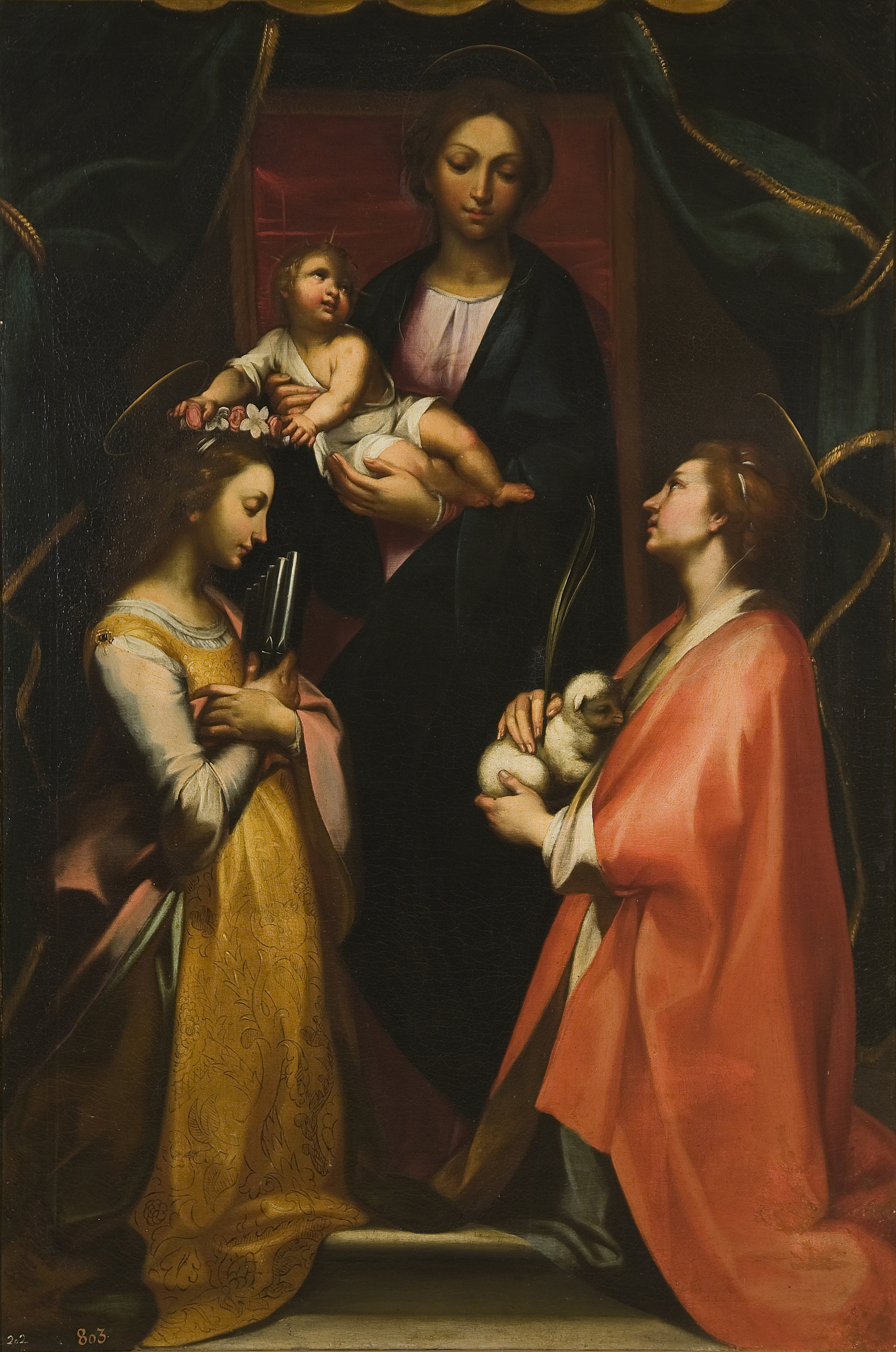
Madonna and Child with Saints Cecilia and Inez, Prado

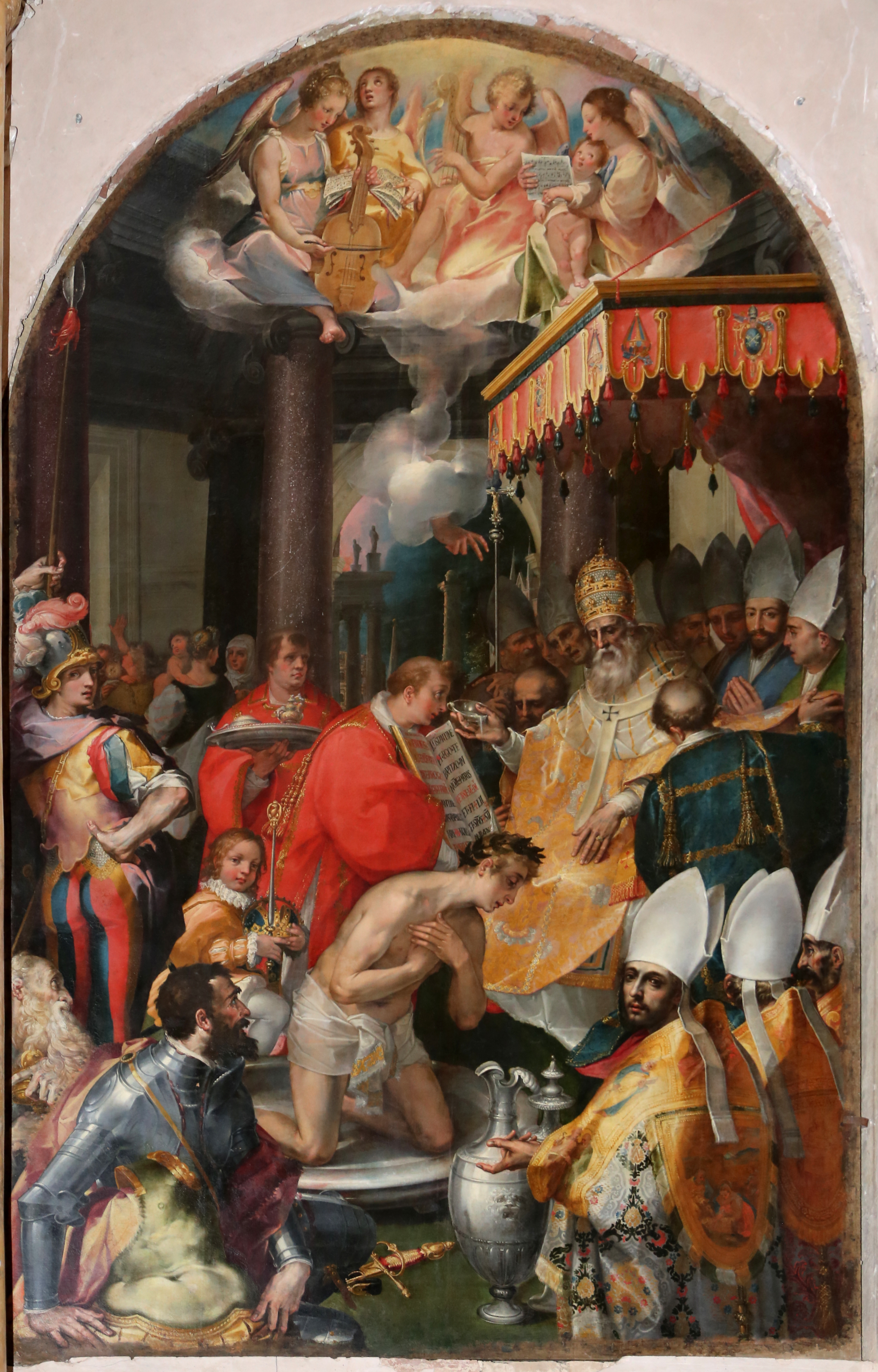
Baptism of Constantine

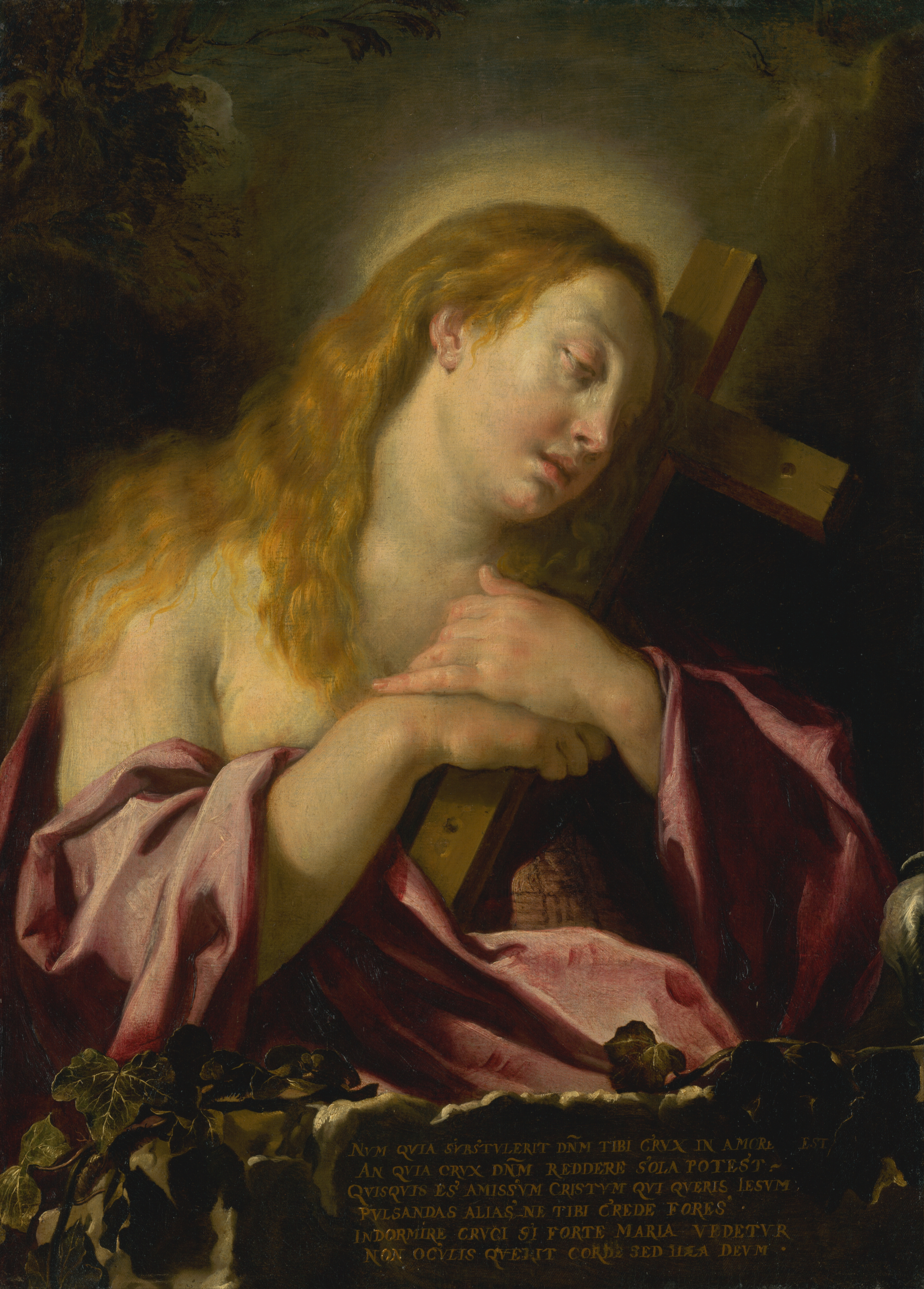
Penitent Mary Magdalen

== Sources ==
- Bryan, Michael (1889). Walter Armstrong; Robert Edmund Graves (eds.). Dictionary of Painters and Engravers, Biographical and Critical. Vol. II L-Z. London: George Bell and Sons. p. 632.
