= Rutilio di Lorenzo Manetti =

Italian painter

Rutilio Manetti
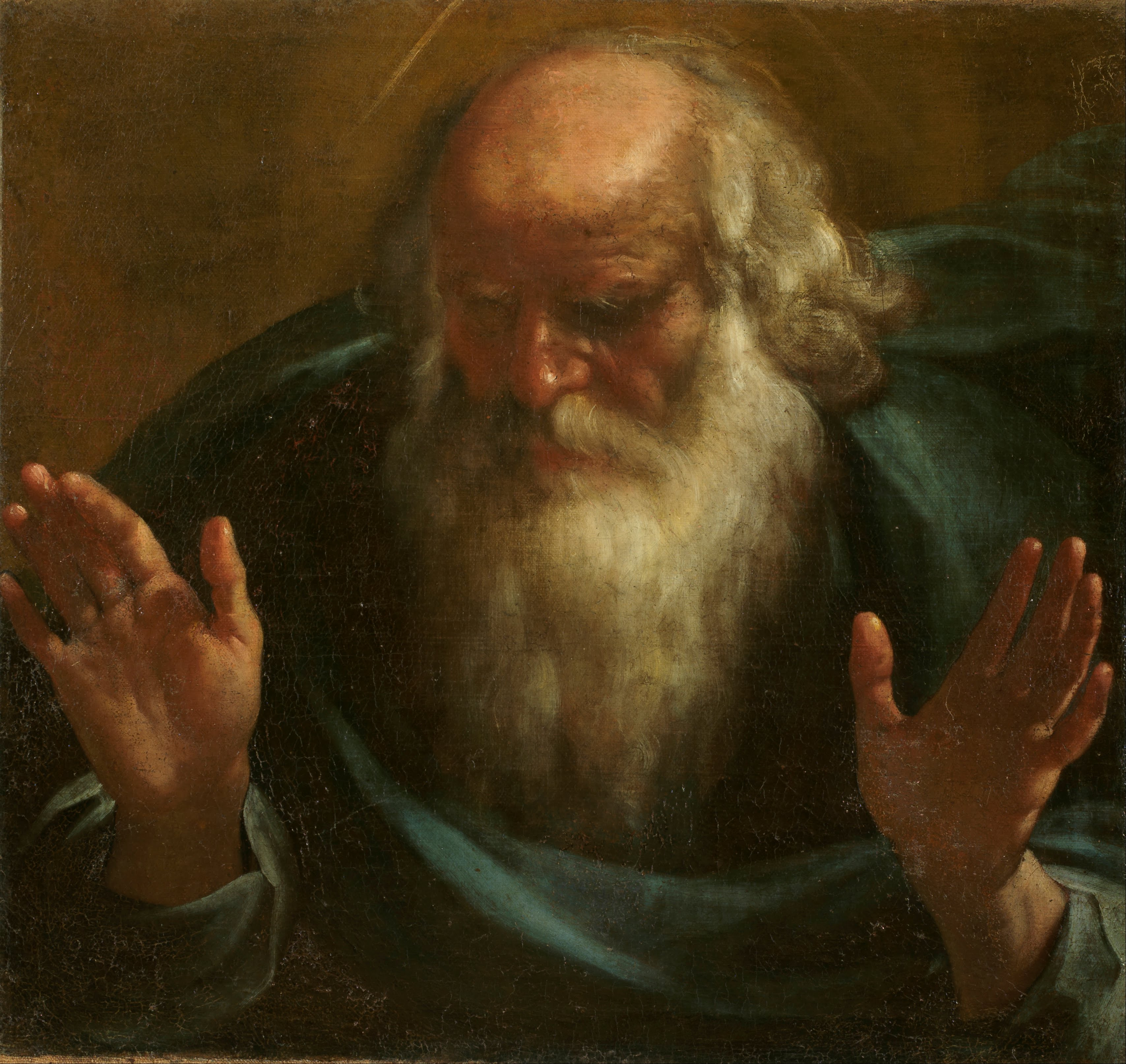
- Ethernal Father, Oratory of the Compagnia di San Bernardino, Siena
- Born: Rutilio di Lorenzo Manetti; 1571; Siena, Grand Duchy of Tuscany
- Died: 22 July 1639 (aged 67–68); Siena, Grand Duchy of Tuscany
- Resting place: Siena Cathedral
- Education: Francesco Vanni; Ventura Salimbeni
- Occupation: Painter
- Movement: Mannerism; Baroque

Rutilio di Lorenzo Manetti (1571 – 22 July 1639) was an Italian painter of late-Mannerism or proto-Baroque, active mainly in Siena. Among his masterpieces are his contributions to the Casino Mediceo, which he worked alongside Matteo Rosselli, Giovanni Lanfranco, and Cesare Dandini.

== Biography ==
Rutilio Manetti was born in Siena in 1571. He studied under the late Mannerist painters Francesco Vanni and Ventura Salimbeni. His earliest works show a strong influence from Federico Barocci and Florentine Mannerist masters, particularly Bernardino Poccetti and Domenico Passignano.

By the early 1620s, Manetti had moved away from his early Mannerism towards the balanced classicism, luminous color, and idealized forms of Roman and Bolognese masters. Although he is not documented in Rome, it is generally assumed that he lived there some time between 1616 and 1621. From Guercino, Caravaggio and the Caravaggisti (especially Artemisia Gentileschi and Orazio Gentileschi, Cecco del Caravaggio and Bartolomeo Manfredi) his paintings gained a sense of naturalism, solidity of form and drama, both in terms of lighting and evocative gesture.

In this style he executed a number of important commissions for altars (e.g. St. Alexander Liberated by an Angel, 1625; Vinci, Sant'Ansano in Greti) and easel paintings (e.g. Samson and Delilah, c. 1625–7; Mexico City, Instituto Nacional de Bellas Artes y Literatura). After 1625 he also produced a number of Caravaggesque gaming and concert scenes in the manner of Gerard van Honthorst and Valentin de Boulogne (e.g. Musicians and Card Players, c. 1626); in these half-length figures are grouped densely around a table that is lit by a single bright candle.

In the Assumption of the Virgin (1632; Forlì, San Mercuriale), Manetti called on the Bolognese work of Guido Reni and particularly Giovanni Lanfranco. He learnt not only from their dramatic compositions but also from their clear light, which crisply defines the forms and highlights drapery shapes. His last paintings were largely executed by his son Domenico Manetti, a less gifted painter, and other workshop assistants, and they are not generally well thought of.

Manetti died in Siena on 22 July 1639 and was buried in the city Cathedral. One of his pupils or followers was the Sienese early Baroque painter Stefano Volpi.

== Gallery ==
Saint Catherine of Siena, National Museum of Norway, Oslo

The Mystic Marriage of Saint Catherine, priv. col.

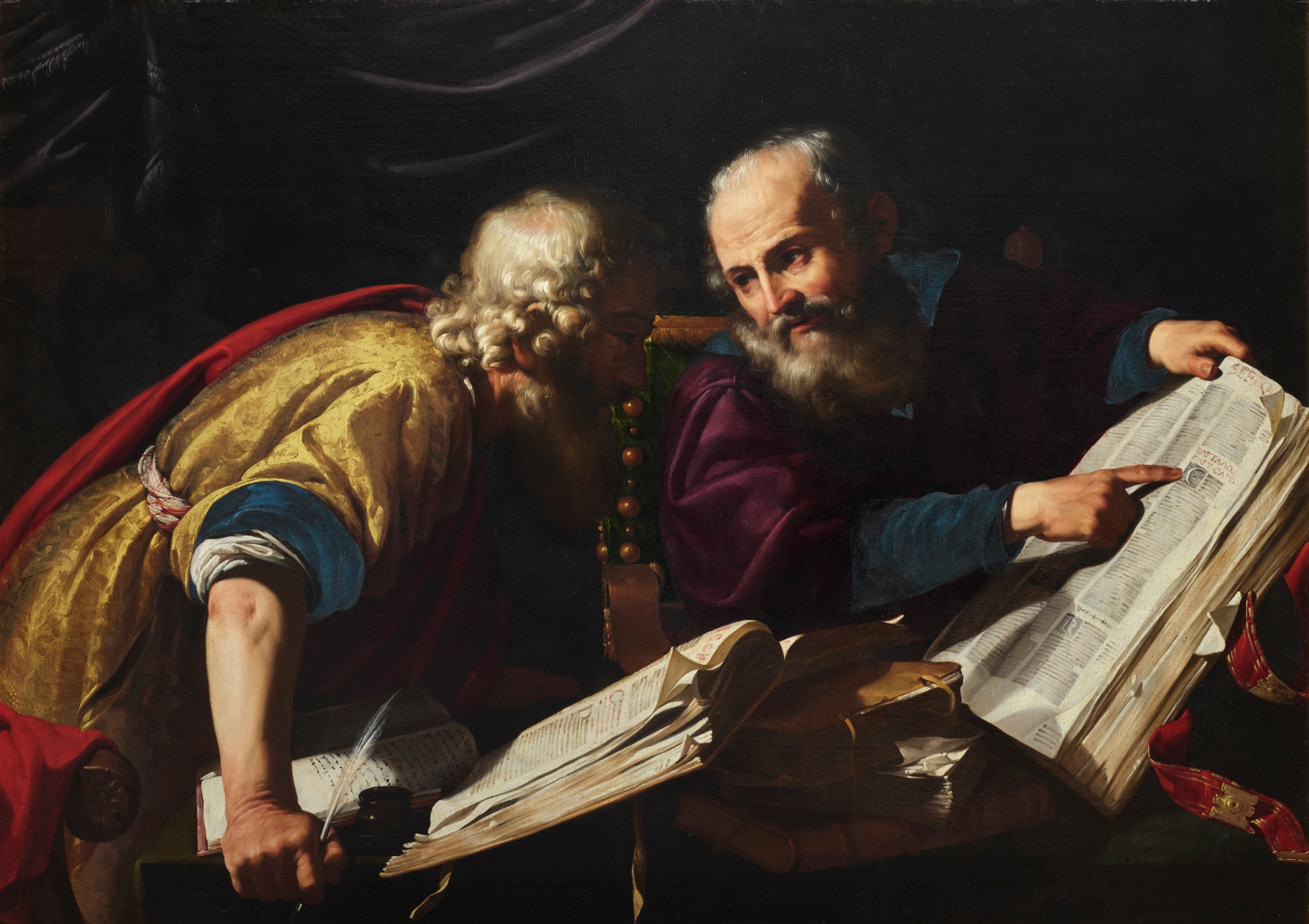
The prophets Jeremiah and Baruch, Galleria Nazionale d'Arte Antica, Rome

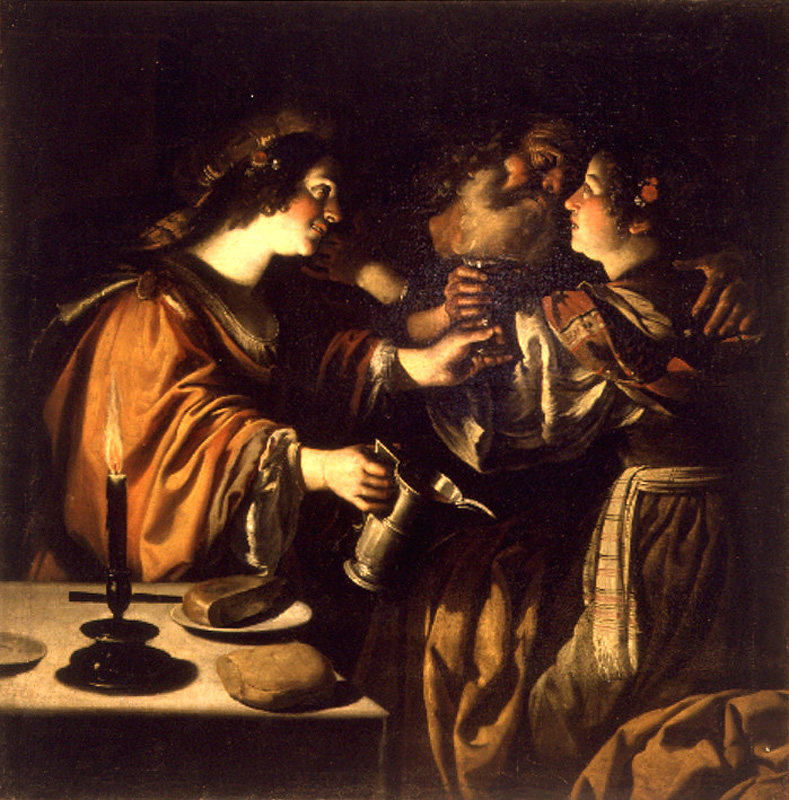
Lot and His Daughters, c. 1620, Museu de Belles Arts de València

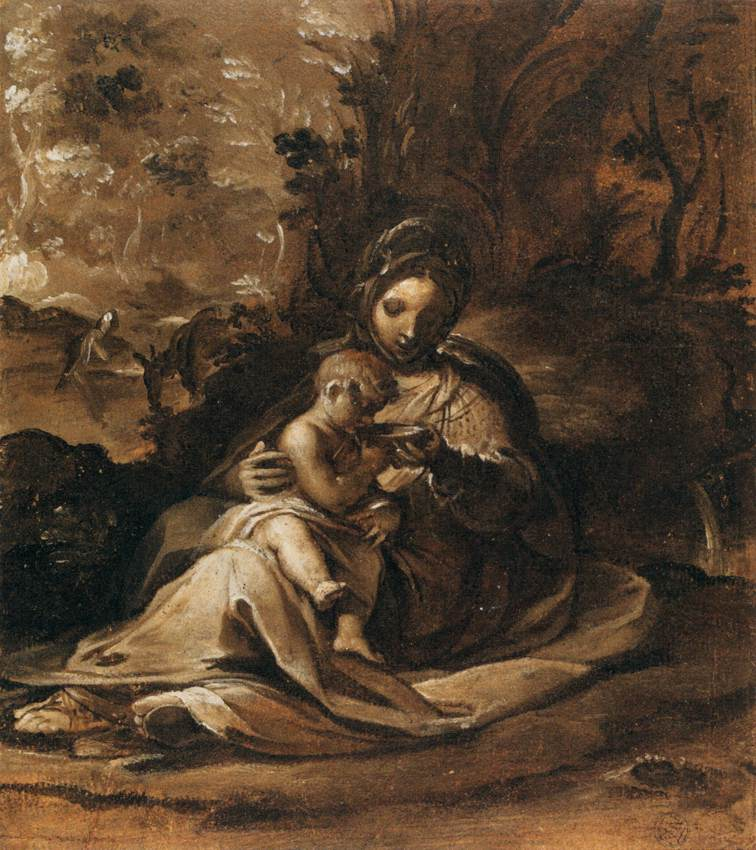
The Rest on the Flight into Egypt, Louvre, Paris

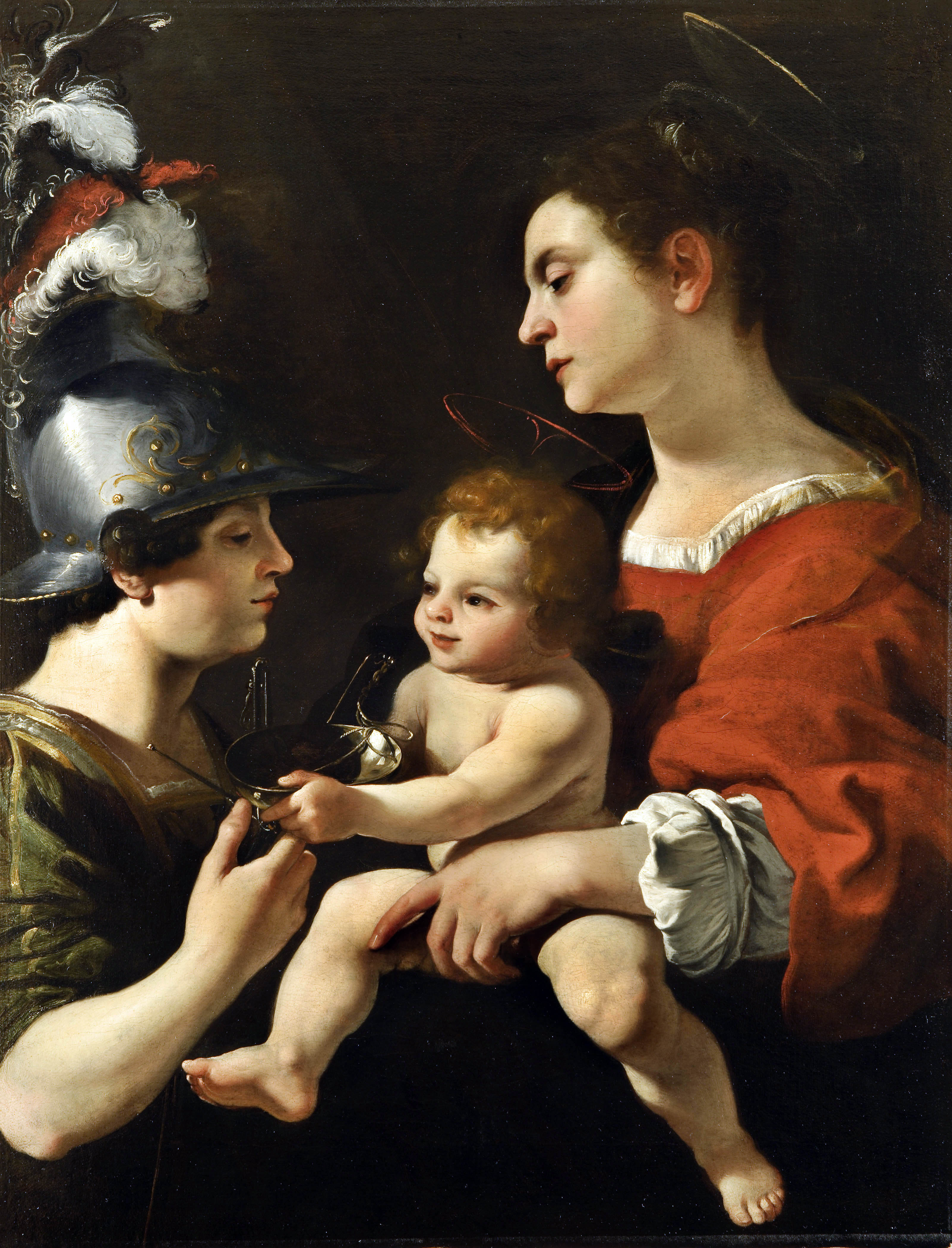
Madonna and Child with the Archangel Michael, priv. col.

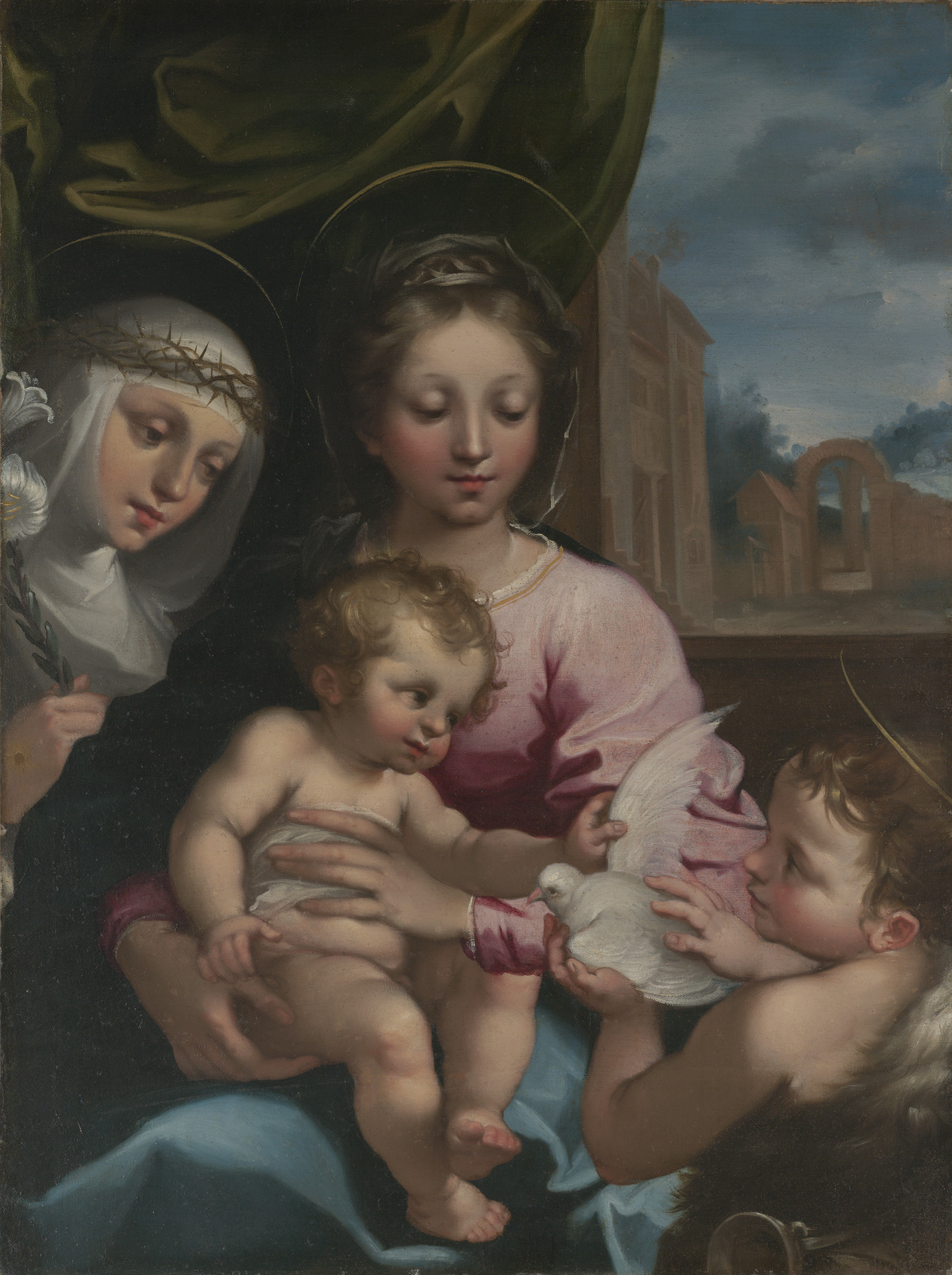
Virgin and Child with the Young Saint John the Baptist and Saint Catherine of Siena, 1608-1610, Yale University Art Gallery, New Haven, Connecticut

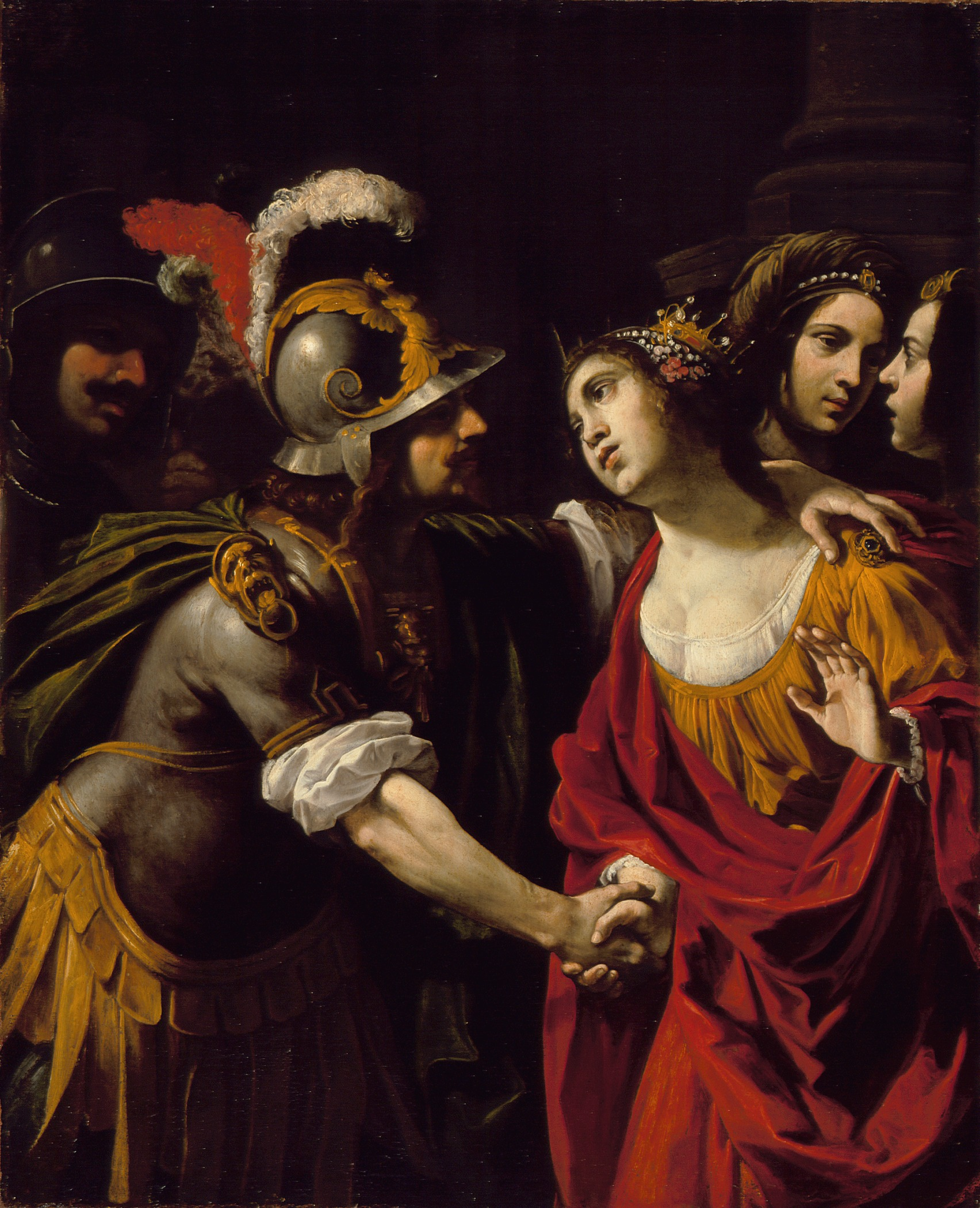
Dido and Aeneas, c. 1630, Los Angeles County Museum of Art, Los Angeles

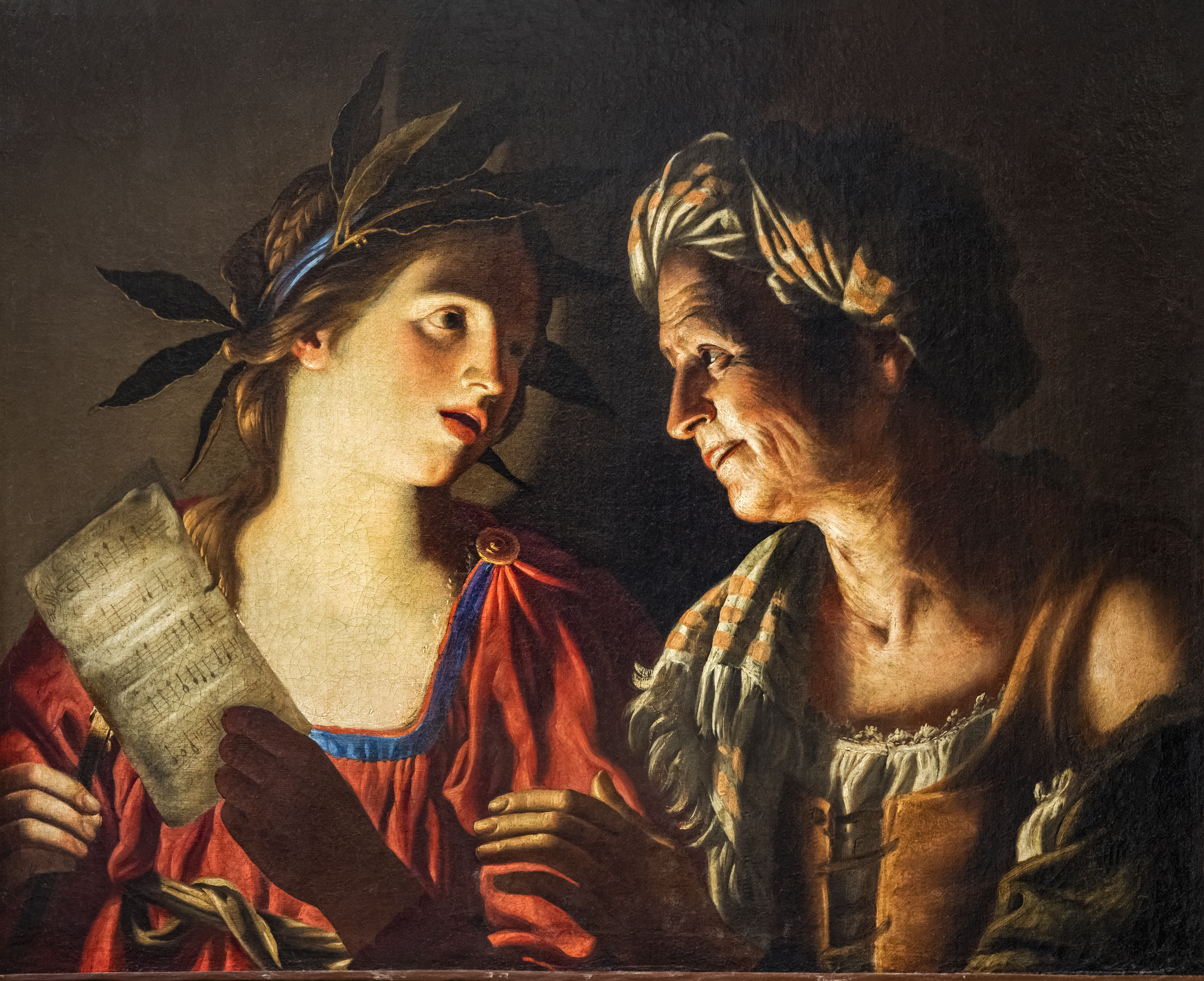
Two Singers, Musée Ingres Bourdelle, Montauban

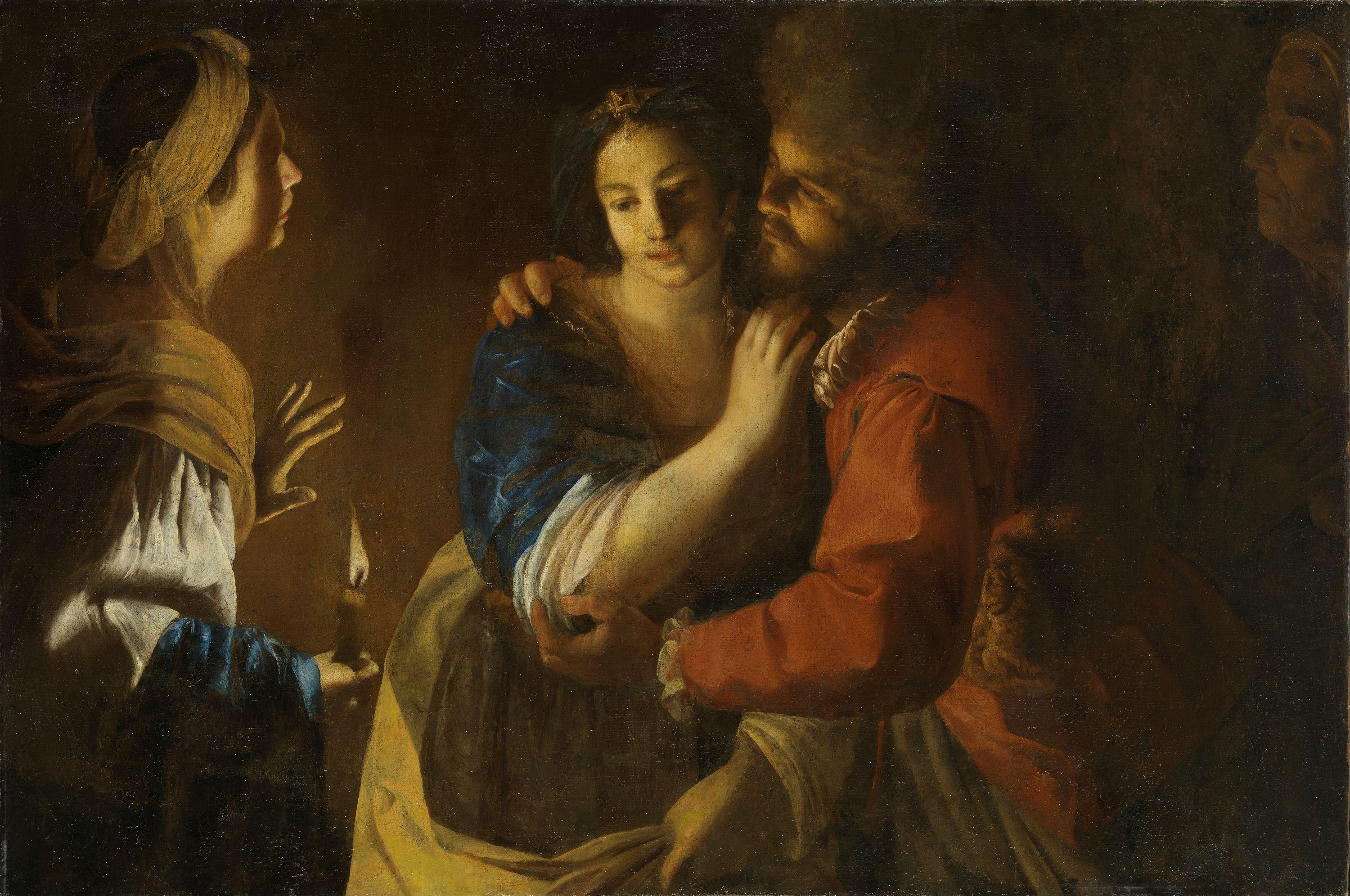
The Interrupted Rendezvous, National Museum of Norway, Oslo

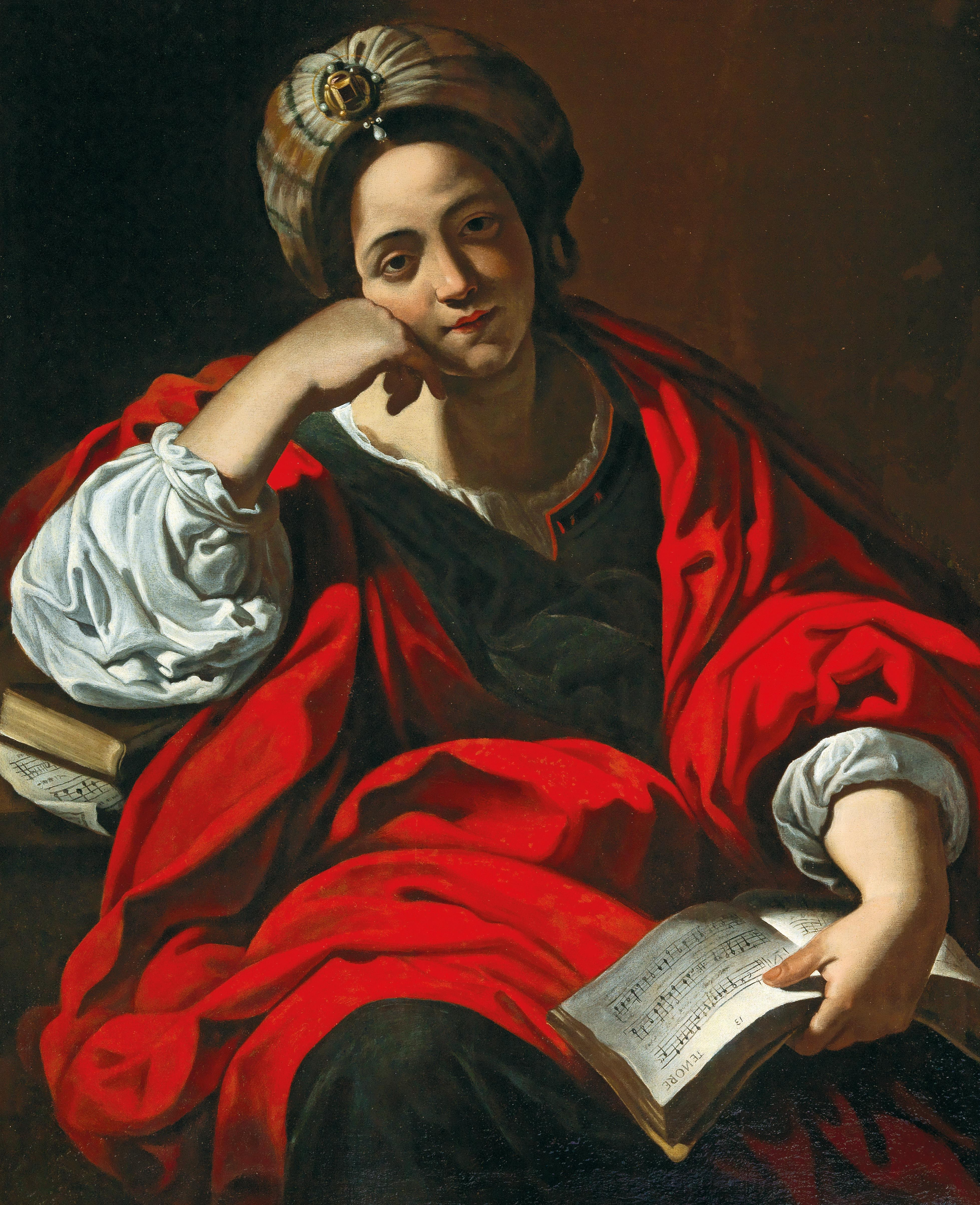
An Allegory of Music, priv. col.

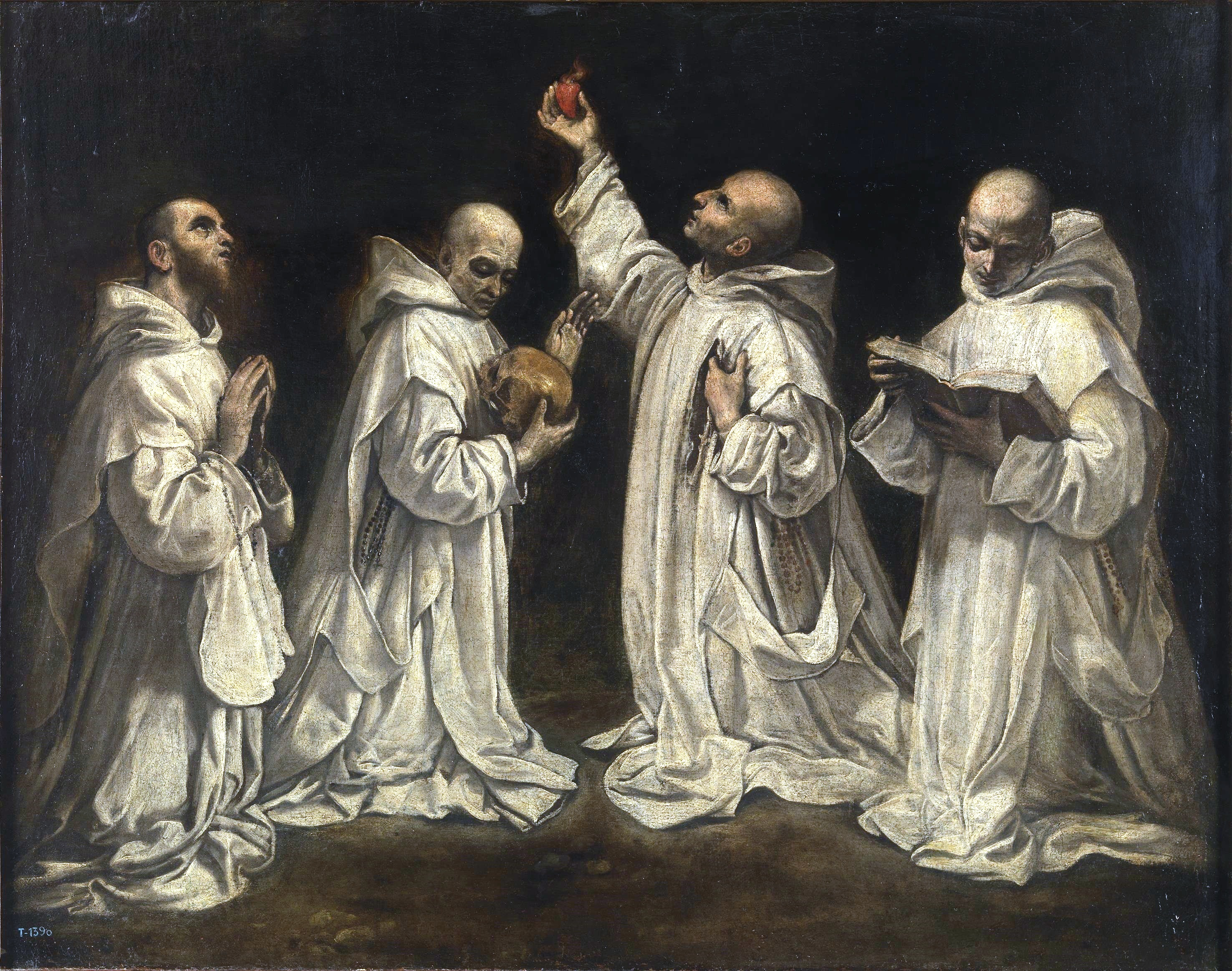
Vision of St. Bruno, Museo del Prado, Madrid

== Sources ==
- Brandi, Cesare (1932). Rutilio Manetti (1571–1639). Florence: Olschki.
- Bortolotti, Luca (2007). "MANETTI, Rutilio". Dizionario Biografico degli Italiani (in Italian). Vol. 68: Malatacca–Mangelli. Rome: Istituto dell'Enciclopedia Italiana. ISBN 978-88-12-00032-6.
- McCorquodale, Charles (1978). "The Manetti Exhibition in Siena". The Burlington Magazine. 120 (909): 885–889. JSTOR 879464.
- Marciari, John (2008). "Rutilio Manetti, Bernardino Capitelli, and Later Sienese Art at Yale". Yale University Art Gallery Bulletin: 138–142. JSTOR 40514724.
