= San Raimondo, Siena =

Roman Catholic church in Siena, Italy

Coordinates: 43°19′00″N 11°20′21″E

San Raimondo, also called San Raimondo al Refugio, is a Baroque style, Roman Catholic church located on the intersection of Via del Refugio and Via di Fiera Vecchia, in the Terzo of Camollia of the city of Siena, region of Tuscany, Italy. The church is dedicated to St Raymond of Pennafort.

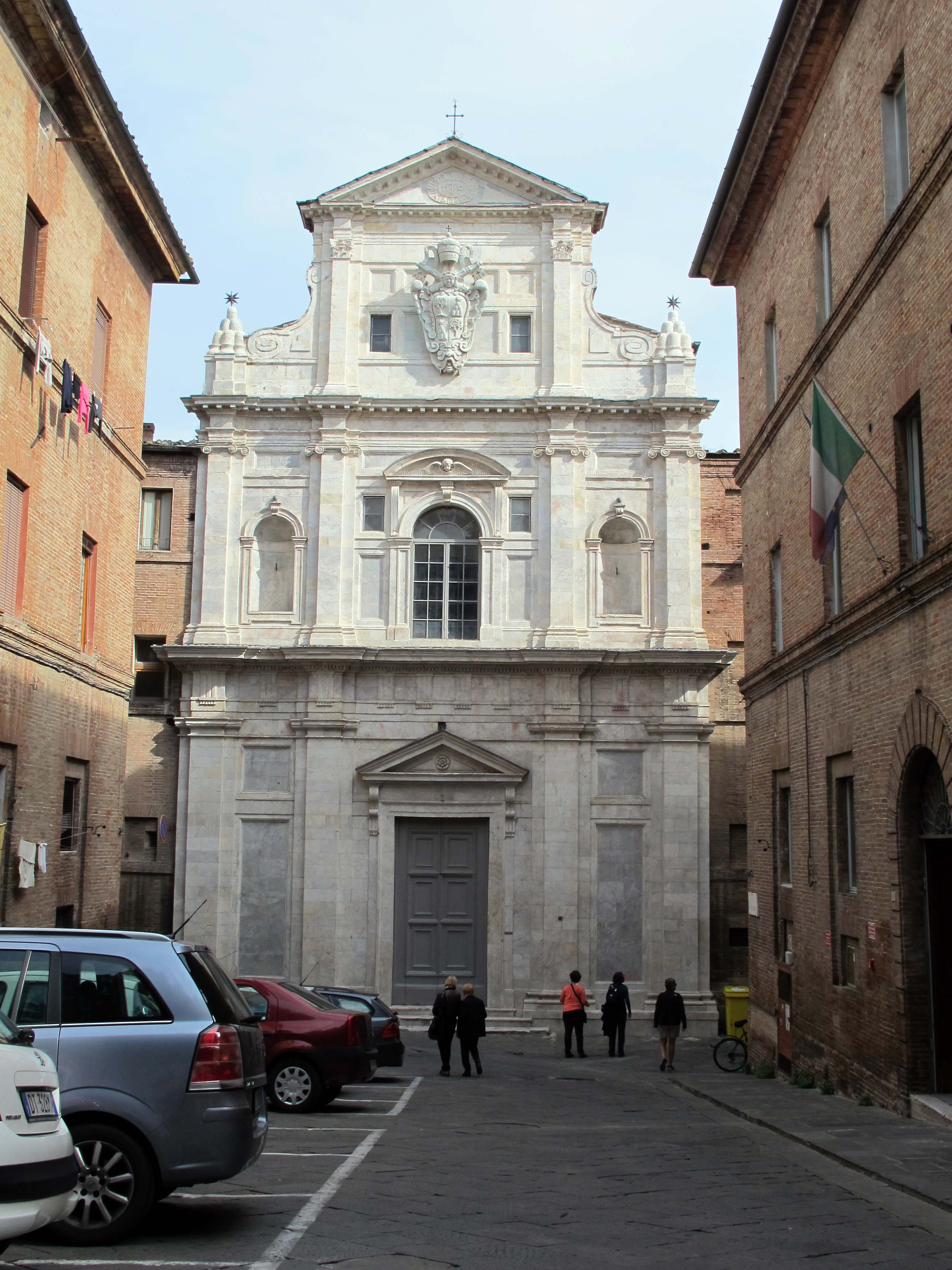
San Raimondo al Refugio

== History ==
The church was commissioned in 1596 in the will of the Sienese noble Aurelio Chigi. The church was adjacent to a conservatory for children of impoverished nobility (nobili decaduto) and thus known as di Refugio. In 1798, an earthquake caused some damage. During the 19th-century it served as a school for young women, called the Royal Conservatorio Riuniti, because it was joined to the adjacent Conservatory of Mary Magdalen.

In 1660, Pope Alexander VII (a Chigi) commissioned from Benedetto Giovannelli the design and construction of a new white marble façade. The church facade has the correct superimposition of orders in the pilaster capitals: with doric, ionic, and finally corinthian. The lateral to the volutes on the third story is the star-topped six mountains found in the heraldic coat of arms of the Chigi. The tympanum has the papal coat of arms with the crossed keys, and a shield with the Chigi heraldry: two oaks and the afore-mentioned six-mountain symbols.

The baroque interior decoration was completed by 1610 by Francesco Della Monna. The marble altars were designed by Flaminio Del Turco; with bronze bas reliefs and the sepulchral monument of Aurelio Chigi were completed by Ascanio da Cortona. The main altarpiece of the Nativity was painted by Alessandro Casolani, but completed in 1606 by Francesco Vanni. Flanking this is an Adoration of the Magi by Astolfo Petrazzi. The lateral altarpieces are the Circumcision of Jesus by Giovanni Battista Giustammiani, the Miracle of Resurrection by San Raimondo by Francesco Rustici. An altar on the right has a Marriage of St Catherine (1601) by Vanni; the side canvases also depicting events in the life of Catherine of Siena are by Sebastiano Folli. On the left is an altar with a Death of San Galgano, a collaboration of Salimbeni and Vanni. It is flanked by a St Michael Archangel appears before San Galgano and Parents of San Galgano attempt to dissuade him from life as a hermit (both 1613) by Rutilio Manetti. A Miracle of St Raymond walks on water is attributed to Stefano Volpe.

The church in 2014 was adjacent to the offices of the Faculty of Letters and Philosophy of the University of Siena. A few steps down the Via di Fiera Vecchia is the Palazzo San Galgano, in 2014, housing the Architecture faculty of the University. The facade of the Palazzo Galgano on Via Roma was designed (1474) by Giuliano Da Maiano.
