= Chigi Palace =

Official residence of the prime minister of Italy

- Palazzo Chigi
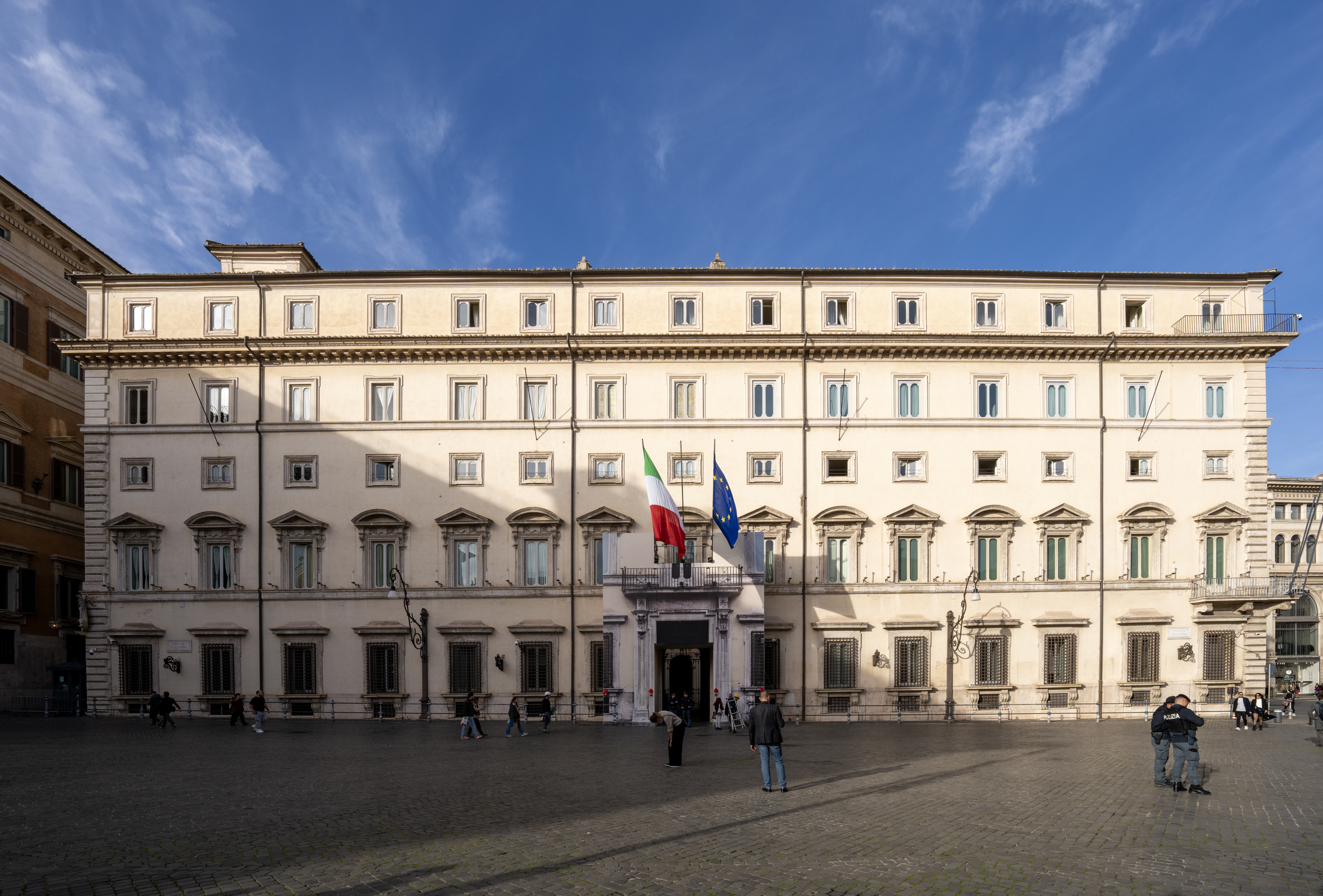
- The palace seen from Piazza Colonna
- Click on the map for a fullscreen view

General information
- Location: Rome, Italy
- Coordinates: 41°54′05″N 12°28′47″E
- Current tenants: Giorgia Meloni (Prime Minister of Italy)
- Construction started: 1562
- Completed: 1580
- Client: Aldobrandini family Chigi family

Design and construction
- Architects: Giacomo della Porta; Carlo Maderno

The Chigi Palace (Italian: Palazzo Chigi [paˈlattso ˈkiːdʒi]) is a palace and former noble residence in Rome which is the seat of the Council of Ministers and the official residence of the prime minister of Italy. It is located in the Piazza Colonna, next to Palazzo Montecitorio, seat of the Chamber of Deputies.

Since 22 October 2022, the tenant of the Chigi Palace has been Prime Minister Giorgia Meloni.

== History ==
The architectural history of Chigi Palace spans more than three centuries during which several projects and continuous adaptations to the ever-changing needs of the palace have followed. The palace, overlooking the Piazza Colonna and the Via del Corso, was begun in 1562 by Giacomo della Porta. On 28 January 1578, the consistorial lawyer Pietro Aldobrandini, brother of the future Pope Clement VIII, purchased a house on Via del Corso. The architect Matteo Bartolini from Città di Castello was entrusted with the project. Aldobrandini already owned a property along the road that borders the so-called "Colonna island", connecting via del Corso with Montecitorio, he intended to unite the two properties. At the death of Pietro Aldobrandini, his son sold the properties to Paolo Fossano, who continued the work on the side of Via del Corso.

In 1616, cardinal Pietro Aldobrandini, nephew of Clement VIII, repurchased the family home, resuming construction and incorporating various houses adjacent to the wing facing the future square. In 1659 it was purchased by the House of Chigi, a rich family of bankers from Siena. It was then remodelled by Felice della Greca and Giovanni Battista Contini. It has five floors, a broad stairway that leads to the living rooms, and a courtyard decorated with a fountain, designed by Giacomo della Porta. The fountain has been copied in many sites in Rome and other Italian cities.

After a couple of centuries in which the building has served mainly as the home of important families of papal Rome, starting from the end of the 1700s, the building was used as the seat of Spanish embassy in Rome.

On 20 April 1770, Wolfgang Amadeus Mozart gave a concert there in the presence of Charles Edward Stuart. In 1878 it became the residence of the Austro-Hungarian Ambassador to Italy. During this period the palace was nicknamed the "Austrian-Vatican mole". At the beginning of the 20th century, the palace was hit by frequent irredentist demonstrations, asking for the independence of Trento and Trieste.

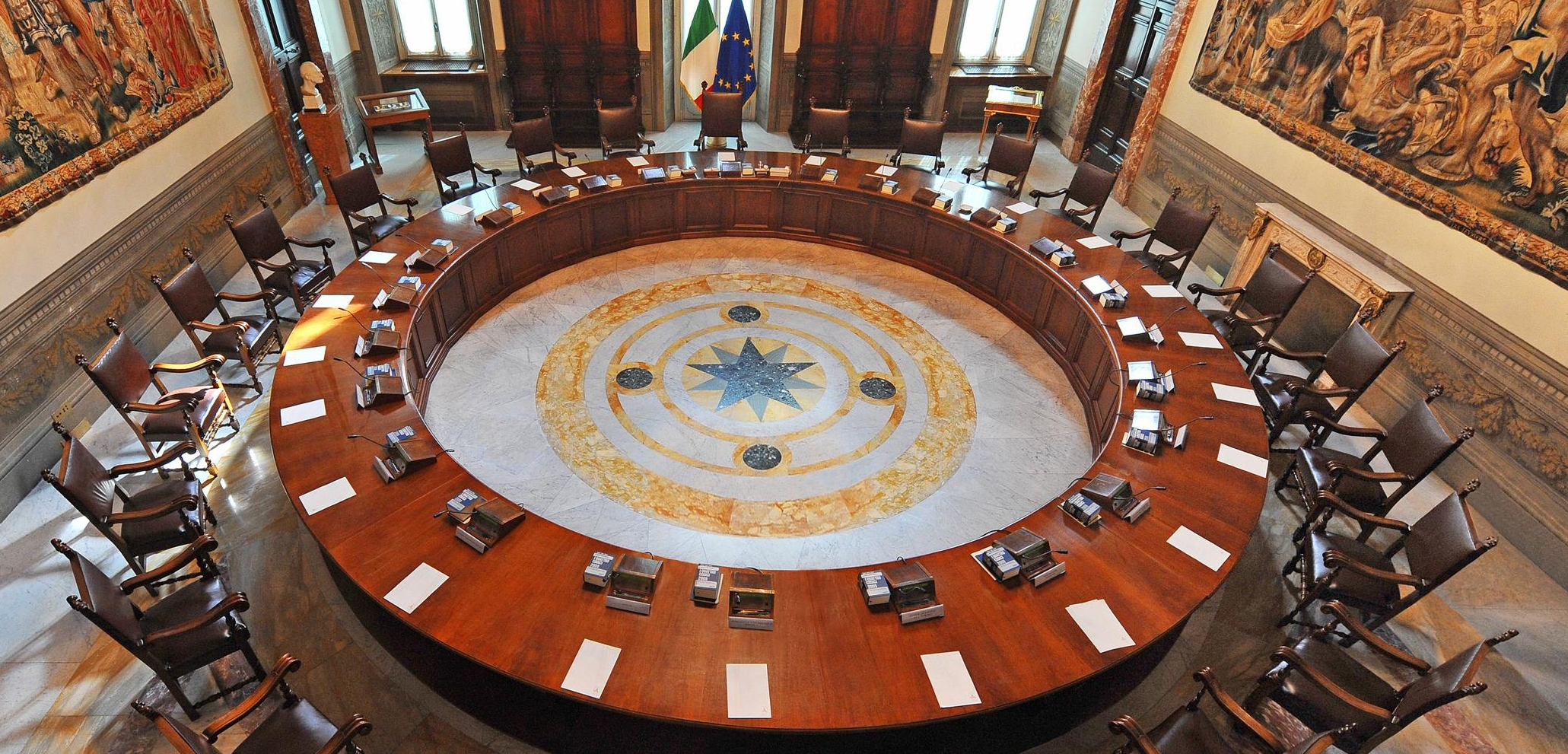
The meeting room of the Council of Ministers

In 1916 it was bought by the Kingdom of Italy and became the seat of the Minister for Colonial Affairs, the ministry responsible for the government of the country's colonial possessions and the direction of their economies.

In 1922, at the beginning of Benito Mussolini's rule, Palazzo Chigi became the official residence of the Italian minister of foreign affairs. In 1961, it became the official meeting place of the Council of Ministers and the residence of its president, who is the head of the Italian government.

At the end of the 20th century, the building underwent a restoration, completed on 7 November 1999. The intervention involved not only the facades, but also the rooms of the prime minister's office, which Prime Minister Giuliano Amato had transferred to another hall of the palace, and that for the occasion it was re-established in its original location.

On 28 April 2013, during the oath of the government led by Enrico Letta, a man, Luigi Preiti, opened fire on two carabinieri, Giuseppe Giangrande and Francesco Negri, injuring the latter and a pregnant passerby.

== Art ==
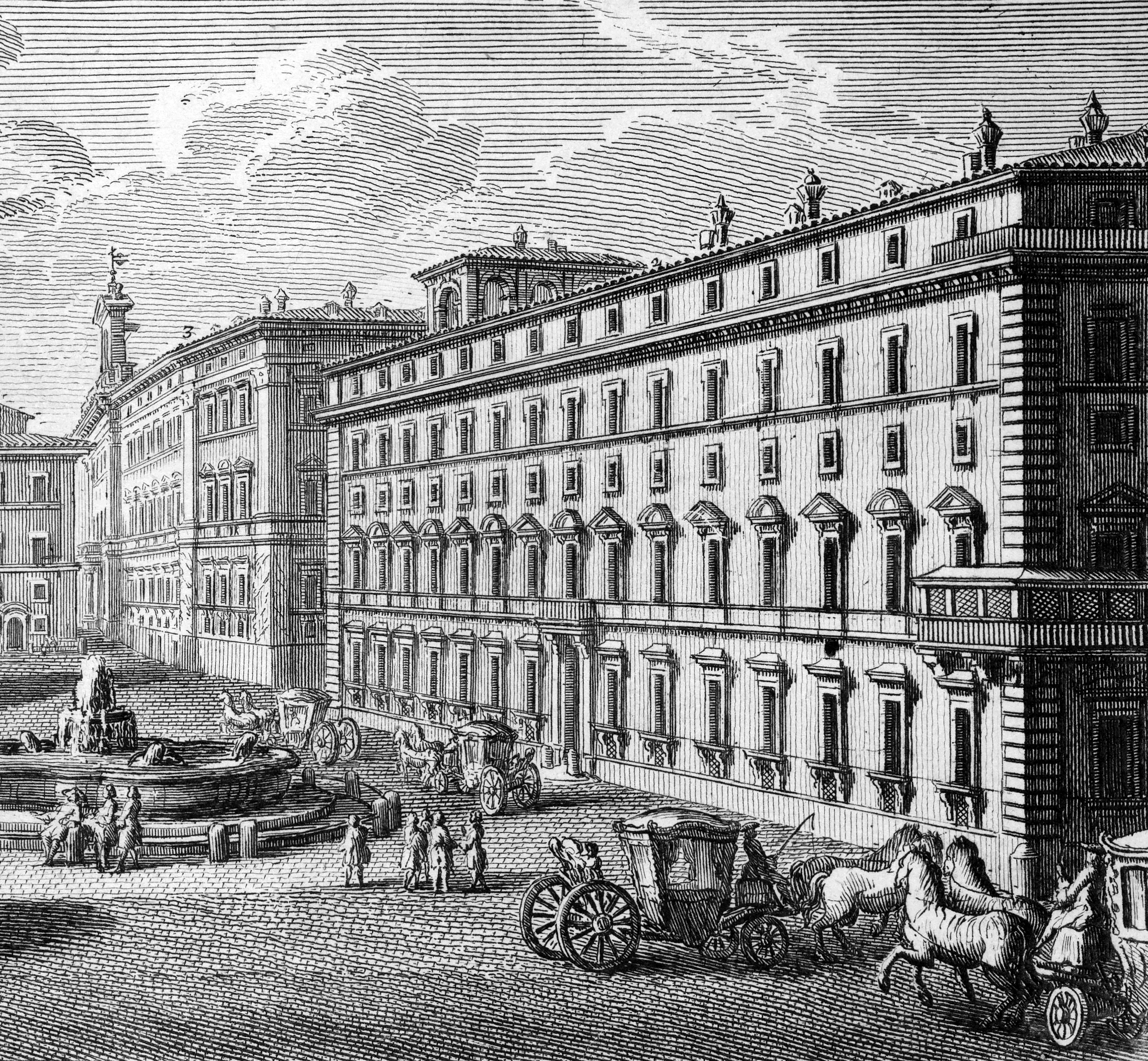
The Palazzo Chigi in an 18th-century etching by Giuseppe Vasi

The Library Hall was commissioned by Agostino Chigi at the end of the 17th century to house the enormous library of cardinal Flavio Chigi. The project was realized by Giovanni Battista Contini.

The Chigi library or Chigiana contained thousands of valuable manuscripts, in large part based on the personal library of Pope Alexander VII, a member of the Chigi family. From the time of Pope Benedict XV, the Vatican attempted to acquire this library, but lacked the necessary funds. Eventually, Pietro Tacchi Venturi was tasked by Pope Pius XI to negotiate the purchase with the newly formed fascist government of Benito Mussolini. Venturi managed to convince Mussolini to donate the library to the Vatican free of charge.

== See also ==
Some other Italian institutional buildings:

- Palazzo del Quirinale – the official residence of the president of Italy
- Palazzo Madama – the seat of the Senate of the Italian Republic
  - Palazzo Giustinani – the official residence of the president of the Senate
- Palazzo Montecitorio – the seat of the Italian Chamber of Deputies
- Palazzo della Consulta – the seat of the Constitutional Court of Italy

== Notes ==
Preceded by Palazzo della Cancelleria	Landmarks of Rome; Chigi Palace	Succeeded by Palazzo Colonna
