= Avogadro =

Avogadro is an Italian surname, derived from avogaro, a Venetian term for a diocese official (equivalent to avvocato, advocatus, "advocate"). In 1389, bishop Nicolò Beruti, made the office of avogaro hereditary, and a number of noble families with the name Avogaro or Avogadro developed over the following centuries, in Brescia, Vercelli and Treviso.

- Albert Avogadro (d. 1214), canon lawyer and Latin Patriarch of Jerusalem
- Amedeo Avogadro (1776–1856), chemist. Named after him are:
  - Avogadro constant
  - Avogadro's law, an ideal gas law
  - Avogadro project, a project to base the standard kilogram mass on the Avogadro constant, rather than an arbitrary block of metal
  - Avogadro (crater), lunar crater
  - Avogadro (software), molecular editor
- Lucia Albani Avogadro (1534–1568), poet
- Oscar Avogadro (1951–2010), lyricist
