= Palazzo San Galgano =

Building in Siena, Italy

Coordinates: 43.316695°N 11.338571°E

The Palazzo San Galgano is a Renaissance style urban palace located on via Roma number 47, in Terzo Camollia of the city of Siena, region of Tuscany, Italy. The palace is around the corner from the church of San Raimondo.

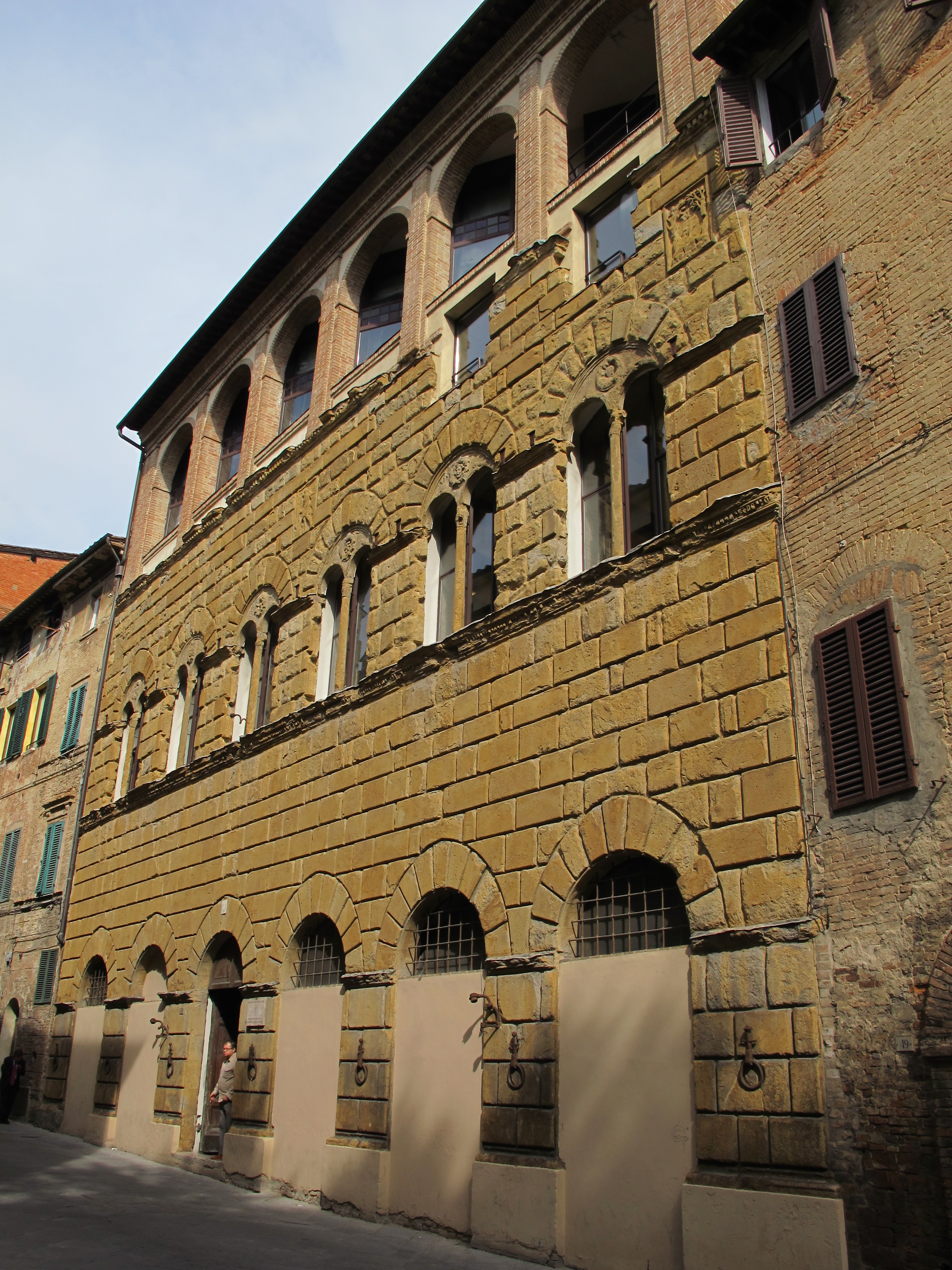
Palazzo San Galgano

== History ==
The palace was commissioned in 1474 by the Giovanni di Niccolò, abbot of the Abbey of San Galgano; the designs were by Giuliano da Maiano, who also designed the Sienese Palazzo Spannocchi.

In the 16th-century, the palace underwent restructuring, when it housed the Congregation of the Abbandonate, and then of the Virgin del Soccorso. The courtyard portico dates from 1600, and the holy stairs and Chigi chapel date from 1710. The palace in 2015 houses the Department of Historical Sciences and Cultural Goods of the University of Siena.

The palace, has six ground floor arches made from rusticated stone, now mostly walled. The second floor retains the mullioned windows.
