= Benedetto Giovannelli =

Italian architect

Benedetto Giovannelli (also Benedetto Giovannelli Orlandi) (1602–1676 CE) was an architect from Siena.

In 1660 he was commissioned by Pope Alexander VII (a Chigi) to build a new marble façade for the church of San Raimondo, which is in three classicist-style superimposed orders.

He was one of a group of architects (the others being Damiano Schifandini, Flaminio del Turco, Giovanni Fontana) who produced buildings marked by a harmonious, measured style.
