= Giovanni Battista Giustammiani =

Italian painter

Giovanni Battista Giustammiani, also called il Francesino (active 1608 to 1643) was an Italian painter active mainly painting sacred subjects in a late-Mannerist style in Siena, Tuscany, Italy. He is sometimes referred to as being French or French-Italian, but there is no documentation to support this.

== Biography ==
Giustammiani's works primarily depict religious scenes and figures. He painted the Miracles of Benedictine Saints for the sacristy of San Domenico. He also painted a glory of angels for the Sacristy of the Siena Cathedral. For the church of San Raimondo, he created an altarpiece depicting the Circumcision of Jesus.

Another notable work by Giustammiani is a depiction of Saint Dominic in Soriano originally painted for the Propositura di Santa Croce in Greve in Chianti, Tuscany. This painting is now housed in the Museum of Saint Francis, also in Greve in Chianti.
