= Andrés Amaya =

Spanish painter (c.1645–1704)

- Born: c. 1645; Unknown
- Died: 29 October 1704; Valladolid, Spain
- Style: Baroque, religious art, oil painter
- Spouse: Isabel Lozano

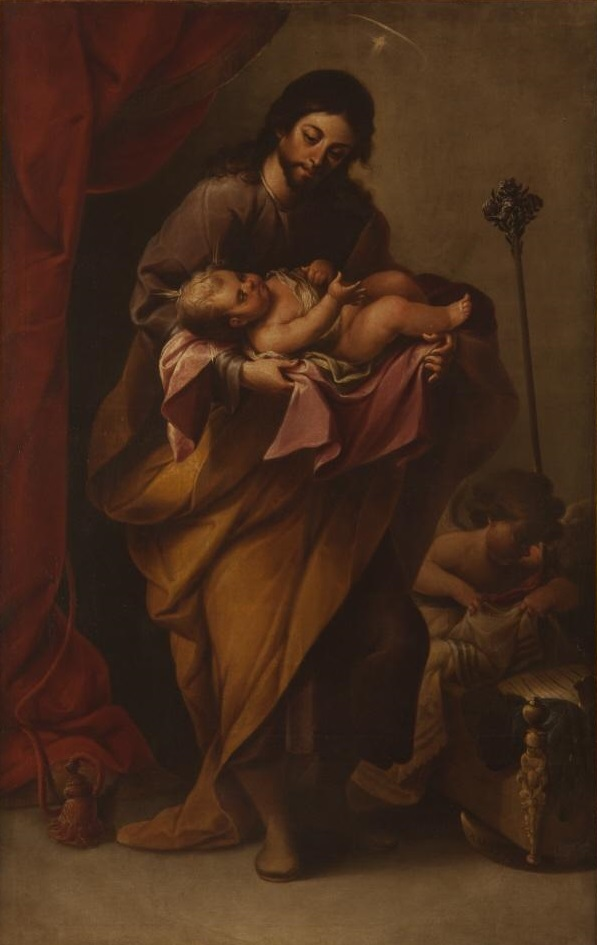
Saint Joseph with the Child, oil on canvas, 154 x 97 cm, Valladolid, National Sculpture Museum.

Andrés Amaya (c. 1645 - 29 October 1704) was a Spanish Baroque painter in oils of religious subjects. He was active in the region of Castile and León, primarily in the city of Valladolid.

== Biography ==
Nothing is known about Amaya's origins and background, and little about his life and career. One modern Spanish source describes his life and activity as cubierta por una enorme bruma ("covered by an enormous mist"). The best that can be said is, that the surname "Amaya" is associated with the small village of Amaya in Burgos, Castile and León. Few of his paintings are dated, which makes it difficult to establish a chronology. Most of his works are on religious subjects, but he is said to have also painted portraits. His surviving works are scattered in and around Valladolid.

According to Spanish art historian Juan Agustín Ceán Bermúdez (1749-1829), Amaya was a disciple of Vicente Carducho (1576/78–1638). Amaya cannot have been Carducho's pupil, because their dates do not overlap. It is possible that Amaya knew or was influenced by later Spanish painters of the Madrid high Baroque school, such as José Moreno (after 1630 - 1677) and Francisco de Solís (c. 1620/1625 - 1684), and the court painters of the time. He has also been said to have been influenced by Alonso Cano (1601-1667).

In 1687, Valladolid painter Amaro Alonso de Llanos (Amaro Alonso Méndez, 1640–1699) married Damiana Jalón y Gallo, widow of the painter Juan Sanz. Amaya was one of the witnesses. That is one of the very few contemporary records of Amaya's existence.

His wife was Isabel (née Lozano). They lived "outside the Puerta del Campo"; that is, roughly in the area of the modern Plaza de Zorrilla in Valladolid. Amaya died on 29 October 1704. The Valladolid painter Ignacio de Prado was his pupil; Amaya's widow called Ignacio "una persona de mi cariño y de que tengo entera satisfacción" ("a person in my affection and in whom I have complete satisfaction").

== Critical reception ==
Ceán Bermúdez said of Amaya, "tienen mejor gusto de color que correccion en el dibuxo" ("he had better taste in colour than in correctness of drawing"). The one authority cited by Ceán Bermúdez was Antonio Ponz (1725–1792), who may only have known Amaya's altarpiece at Iglesia de San Martín, Segovia. Spanish art historian Alfonso Pérez Sánchez (1935-2010) had a more generous opinion. So had the anonymous author who wrote for the National Museum of Sculpture, Valladolid in 2001, "Fue artista bien preparada para la composición, mostrando gran habilidad en la angrupación y relación de las figuras" ("He was a masterful artist in composition, showing great skill in the grouping and relationship of people").

== Works ==
These works have been attributed to Amaya:

- 1682 – Pinturas del retablo mayor ("paintings at the main altar"), Iglesia de San Martín, Segovia
- 1693 – San Francisco y Santa Teresa ("St Francis and St Teresa"), Iglesia Penitencial de la Vera Cruz, Valladolid
- c. 1667-1700 – La Virgen apareciéndose a Fernando III el Santo ("The Virgin appears to Fernando III the Saint"), National Museum of Sculpture, Valladolid
- Last third of 17th century – Apparizione della Vergine ad un domenicano di Soriano ("The Virgin appears to a Dominican in Soriano"), National Museum of Sculpture, Valladolid
- c. 1693 – Sagrada Familia ("The Holy Family"), Iglesia Penitencial de la Vera Cruz, Valladolid
- c. 1700 – San Joaquín ("St Joachim"), Iglesia de San Pedro, Valladolid
- Unknown date – San José con el Niño ("Saint Joseph and the Christ Child"), Valladolid Cathedral (Note: It is unclear whether the paintings in Valladolid Cathedral and the National Museum are the same or different.)
- Unknown date – San José con el Niño ("St Joseph and the Christ Child"), National Museum of Sculpture, Valladolid
- Unknown date – Serie de lienzos sobre la vida de San Juan Bautista ("series of paintings on the life of St John the Baptist"), Basílica de San Isidoro, León
- Unknown date – unknown subject, Iglesia de San Miguel, Palencia
- Unknown date – unknown subject, (Note: The corresponding article in Spanish Wikipedia says Desposorios místicos de santa Gertrudis y san Antonio Abad ("The mystical betrothals of Saint Gertrude and Saint Anthony Abbot"), but does not cite any source.) San Millán de la Cogolla
- Unknown date – unknown subject, Toro, Zamora
- Unknown date – unknown subject, Villafranca del Bierzo

== Gallery ==
La Virgen apareciéndose a Fernando III el Santo (c. 1667-1700)

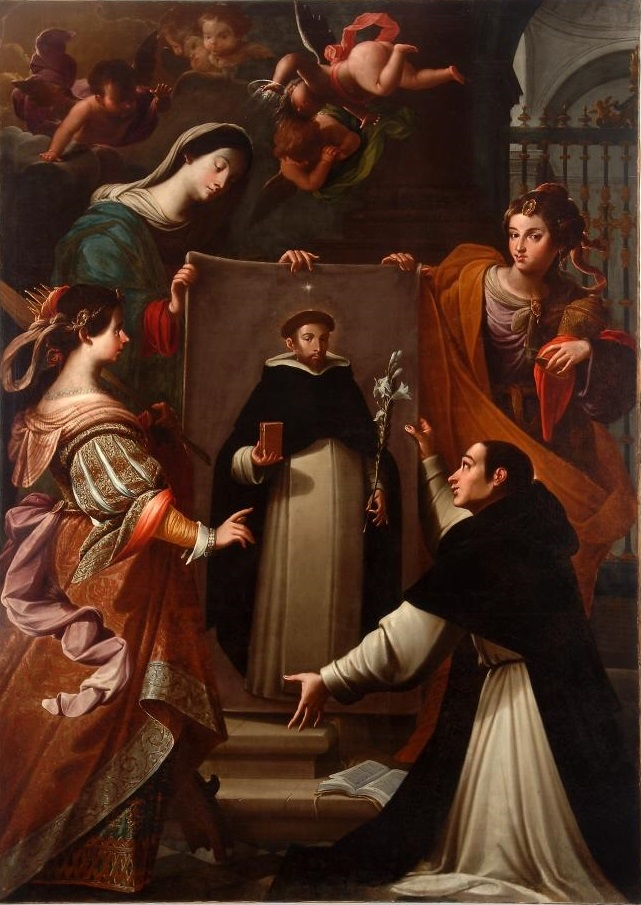
Apparizione della Vergine ad un domenicano di Soriano (last third of 17th century)

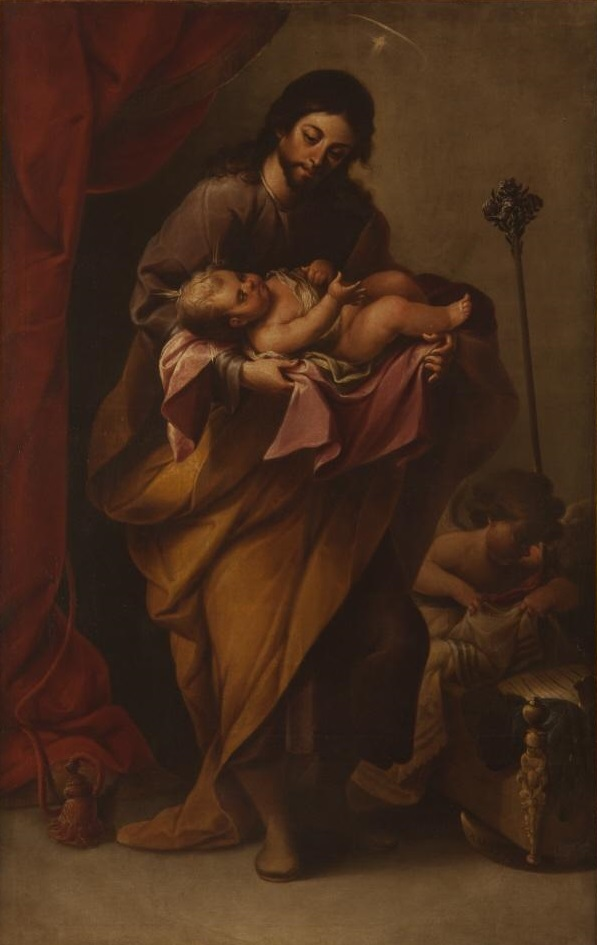
San José con el Niño (c. 1680-1700), National Museum of Sculpture

San Francisco y Santa Teresa (1693)

Sagrada Familia (c. 1693)
