= Saint Dominic in Soriano =

1530 painting

Saint Dominic in Soriano (Italian: San Domenico in Soriano; Spanish: Santo Domingo en Soriano) was a portrait of Saint Dominic (1170–1221) kept in the Dominican friary at Soriano Calabro in southern Italy. It is known to have been present at the friary from the early 17th century. According to legend the painting had been delivered to Soriano Calabro in 1530 by a delegation from heaven, and was associated with many miracles. It was the subject of a Roman Catholic feast day celebrated on 15 September from 1644 to 1913. Its miraculous origin was the subject of several 17th-century paintings. Several ecclesiastical buildings have been named after it.

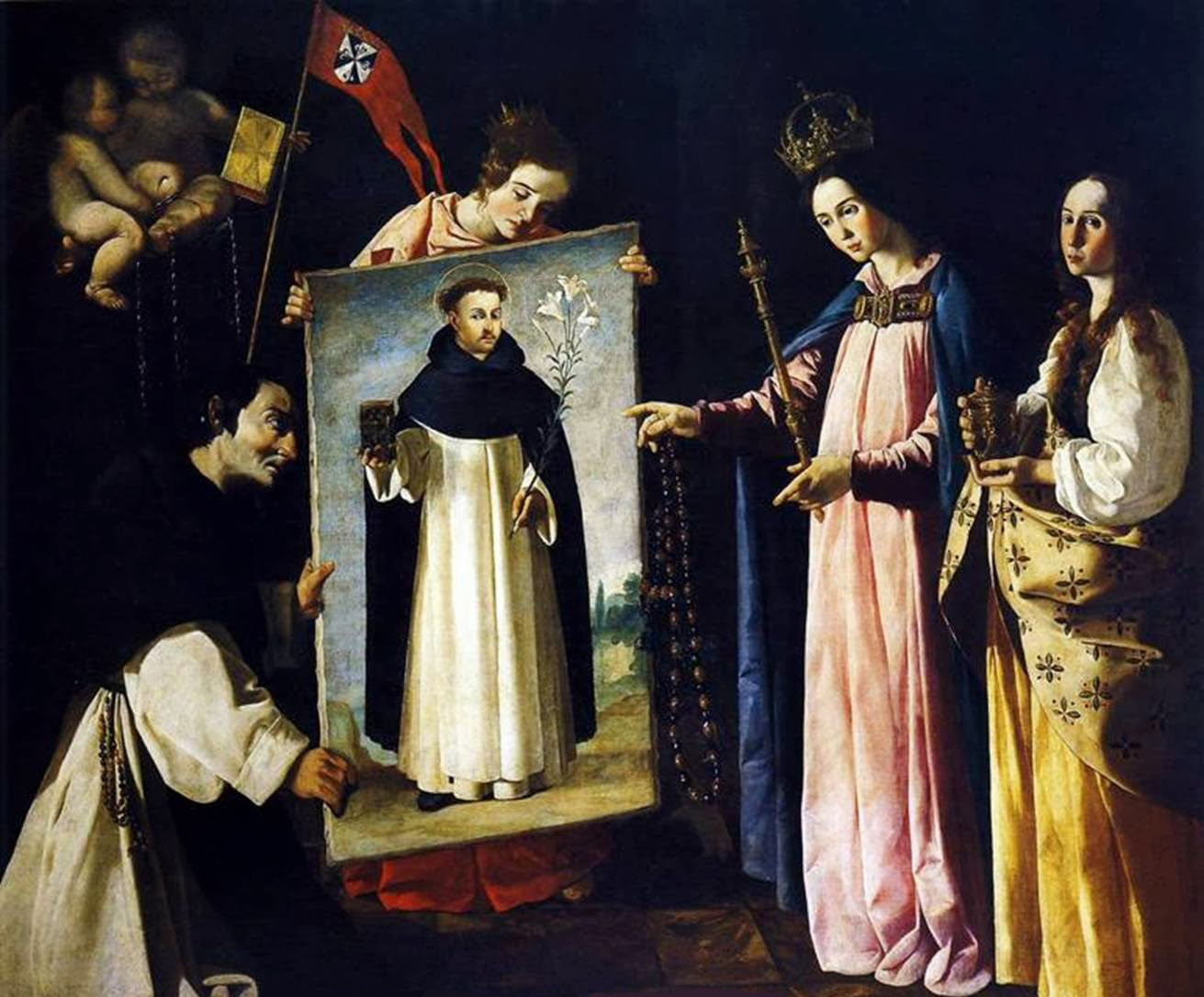
Apparition of the Virgin to the Monks of Soriano by Francisco de Zurbarán, 1626, incorporating a copy of Saint Domingo in Soriano

== History ==
In 1510, Dominican friars founded a priory at Soriano Calabro, Calabria, in the arch of the foot of the boot of Italy.

In 1621, Silvestro Frangipane, a Dominican, published a book that contains the first account of the painting's miraculous origin:

Fra Frangipane wrote (in an English translation):

It happened that, during the night before the octave of the Nativity of the Madonna, (Note: 8 September.) in the Year of Our Lord 1530, the sacristan of Soriano had risen, as was his custom, at 3 o'clock in the morning to light the church lamps. Three ladies of wonderful appearance, the first of whom seemed much afflicted by grief, finding the door unlocked, entered. Their leader, her grief turning into joy, asked, “What church might this be?” The sacristan replied, “This church is dedicated to Saint Dominic. We have no paintings on the walls, except for that crude depiction of him behind the altar.” The venerable matron said, “So that your church may have another icon, take this and give it to your superior. Then, tell him to place it above the altar.” With great reverence, the sacristan accepted the gift and brought it to his superior. When the superior and two other brothers came to the church, the ladies were nowhere to be seen. One of them later said, “While I knelt in prayer, Saint Catherine the Virgin appeared to me and said: I, together with the Virgin Mother of God and the Magdalene, have conferred this favour upon you.”

That narrative is largely the one accepted by the Dominican Order today.

After publication of Frangipane's account, the portrait acquired a reputation for having marvellous properties. According to Fra Frangipane, if it was ever hung in a place other than the one specified by the Virgin Mary, the following morning it would be back in its proper place. He described numerous other miracles attributed to its presence. In 1644, Pope Innocent XII ordained a feast day on 15 September to commemorate its origin and properties. (Note: The years from when the portrait began to gain its reputation until its official recognition fall squarely within the Counter-Reformation, which is dated 1545–1648.) The feast may have been suppressed in 1913, when Pope Pius X moved what had until then been the movable feast of Our Lady of Sorrows to the fixed date of 15 September. (Note: Saint Dominic has always been held in the highest regard. The feast may have been removed from the church calendar simply because its subject, the portrait, no longer existed. If there is any mention of either the portrait or the feast in Catholic Encyclopedia (1907–1912), it is not easy to find.)

Soriano Priory was badly damaged by an earthquake in 1659 of 6.6 magnitude. It was rebuilt; but in 1783, Calabria was struck by a series of five earthquakes within two months. The first, on 5 February, was of 7.0 magnitude, and levelled Soriano to the ground. The third, on 7 February, was of 6.6 magnitude, and its epicentre was 3 km from Soriano. In Soriano itself, 171 people had died, and damage estimated at 80,000 ducats had been caused. The painting was recovered but it was severely damaged and torn in two. Subsequently, the canvas was mounted onto a wood panel and the image was completely repainted.

== A description of the painting ==
In 1634, Fra Frangipane wrote:

E il corpo di quell'Imagine di cinque palmi, & un quarto di lunghezza, nella desto mano ha un libro, e nella sinistra un giglio, doue egli si dimostra di mediocre slatura, di bell aspetto, ma venerando, e mortificato, co'l uolio alquanto affilato; il naso aquilino; i capelli la maggior parte son canuti; e gli altri così della barba, come della testa vanno alquante al rosso; la faccia è molto bianca, & hà co'l cadere congiunta la palidezza: gli occhi sono serenissinimi, e da ogni parte, ch'essi si guardino, rimirano con un piaciuolissimo terrore: le vesti, e l'habito non passano il tallone, restando tutto il piede di scarpe nere coperto: e finalmente tutta l'Imagine altro non rassembra se non artificio celeste, e diuino.

An English translation:

And the figure in that Picture, which is five palms high and four broad, (Note: If the measurements are in Neapolitan 'palmi' (which seems likely for a book published in the Kingdom of Naples), then the picture was about 52 inches (130 cm) x 41.5 inches (105 cm).) in his right hand holds a book, and in his left a lily, is of medium stature, of handsome aspect, but venerable, and mortified, with somewhat sharply defined features; his nose is aquiline; his hair is mostly white; and the rest, like that of his beard, reddish; his face is very white, as if he was at one with pallidity: his eyes are most serene, and follow you everywhere you go, inducing a mild feeling of terror: his garments and habit do not extend down to his heels, thus displaying his feet clad in black shoes: and, in conclusion, the whole Picture exhibits nothing but celestial, and divine, workmanship.

The repainted image now preserved in Soriano Calabro is larger than life size, and – unlike the original painting – depicts the saint beardless and standing in front of a brick wall.

== Artistic representations ==
The miraculous origin of the portrait seems to have been a significant topic for religious art in 17th-century Italy and Spain, as evidenced by the number of paintings described later in this section. It is uncertain which, if any, of the painters had seen the original. Those paintings are consistent in showing Dominic slightly less than life-size, full length, wearing his habit, with book and lily, thus generally conforming to Fra Frangipane's 1634 description; but differ in detail. They are also consistent in another way: all show the three saints exhibiting the open painting to one or more friars.

Examples (with provenance, where known) include (arranged approximately by date):

- First half of 17th century – Giovanni Battista Giustammiani (Italy) – for the Propositura di Santa Croce, Greve in Chianti, Tuscany; now in the Museum of Saint Francis, Greve in Chianti.
- c. 1620 – Carlo Bononi (Italy) – Church of St Dominic, Ferrara.
- 1626 – Francisco de Zurbarán (Spain) – Santa María Magdalena, Seville.
- 1629 – Juan Bautista Maíno (Spain) – Museo del Prado, Madrid.
- 1640 – Matteo Rosselli (Italy) – Church of San Marco, Florence.
- Mid 17th century – Jacopo Vignali (Italy) – Convent of San Marco, Florence; one of the first examples taken from the original.
- c. 1652 – c. 1657 – Alonso Cano (Spain) – Indianapolis Museum of Art, Indiana.
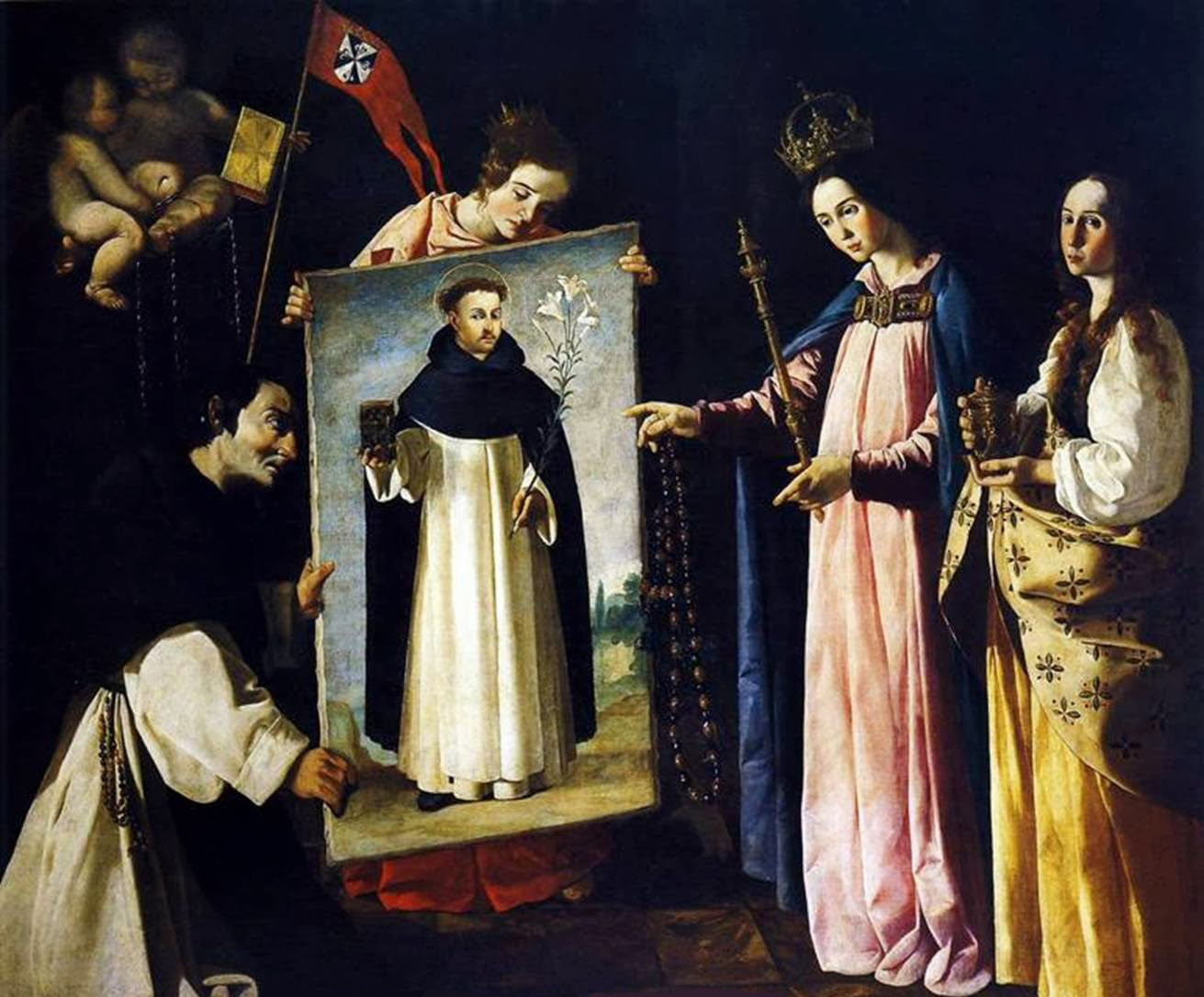
Francisco de Zurbarán

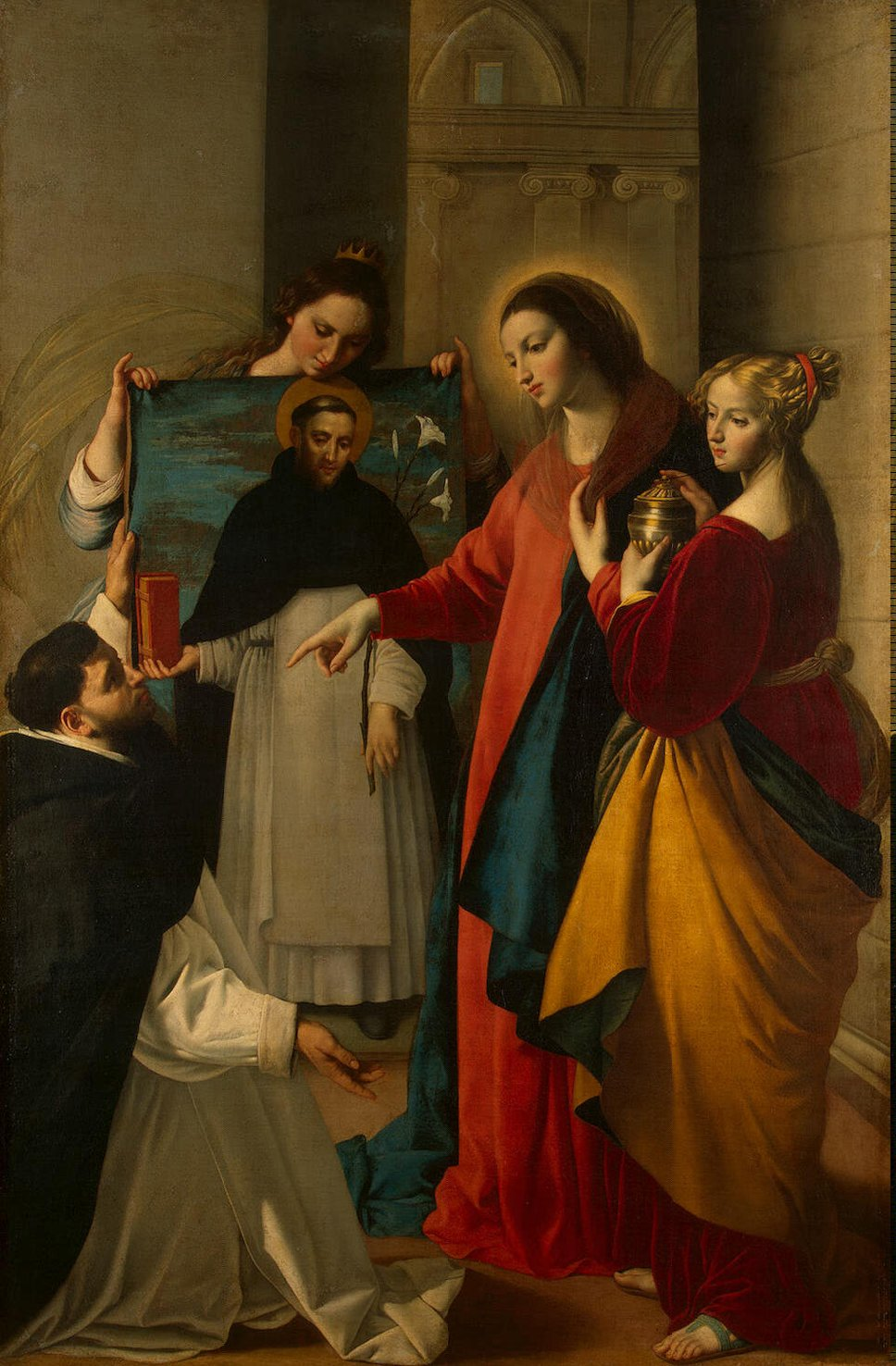
Juan Bautista Maíno

Matteo Rosselli

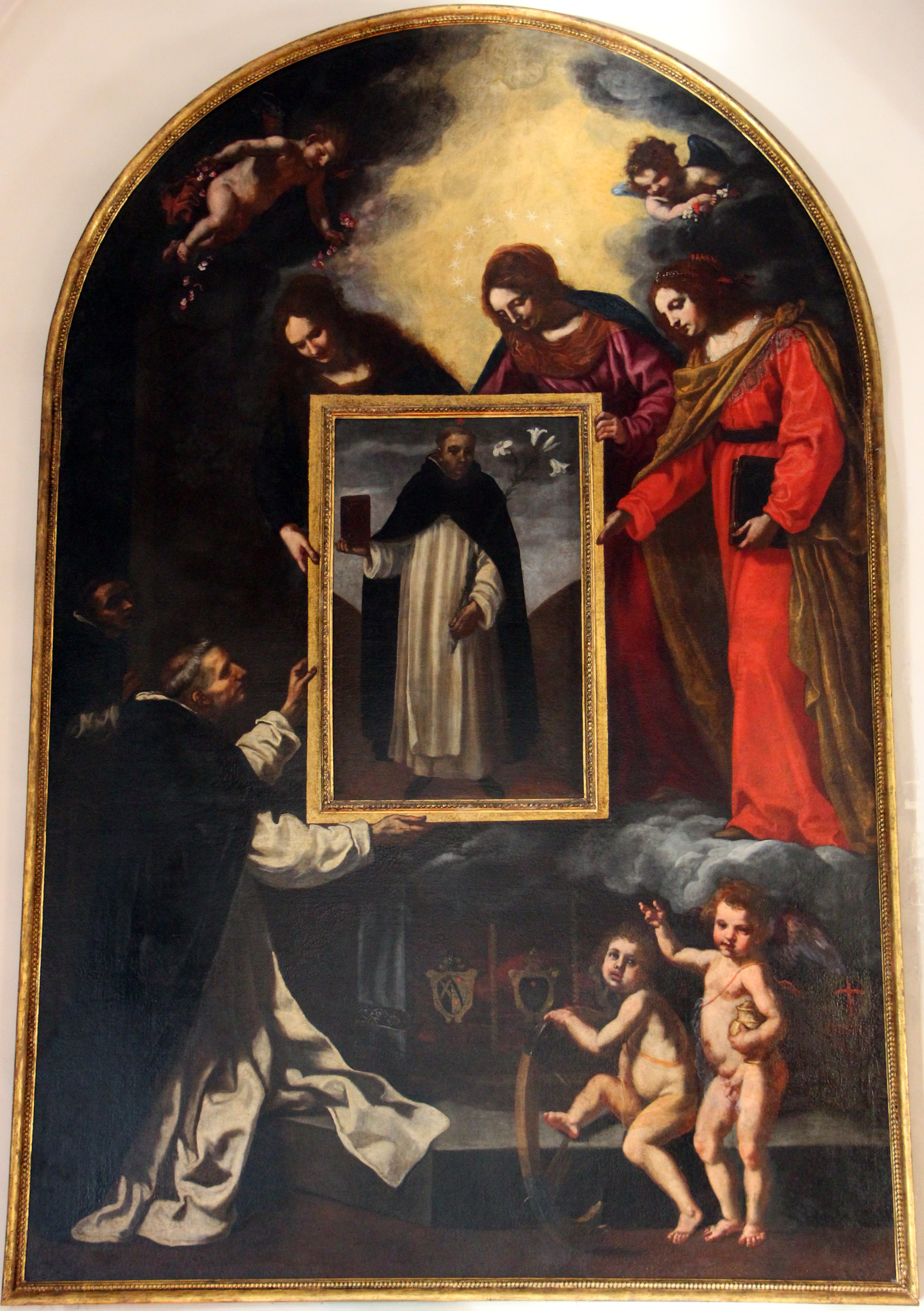
Jacopo Vignali
- c. 1655 – Antonio de Pereda (Spain) – Museo Cerralbo, Madrid.
- c. 1655 – Giovanni Benedetto Castiglione (Italy) (the male figure at bottom right is Saint Ambrose) – Santa Maria di Castello, Genoa.
- c. 1660 – Pedro Atanasio Bocanegra (Spain) – once in the collection of William Coesvelt, Amsterdam; in 1815, purchased by Tsar Alexander I of Russia; now in the Hermitage Museum, St Petersburg.
- Last third of 17th century – Andrés Amaya (Spain) – National Museum of Sculpture, Valladolid.
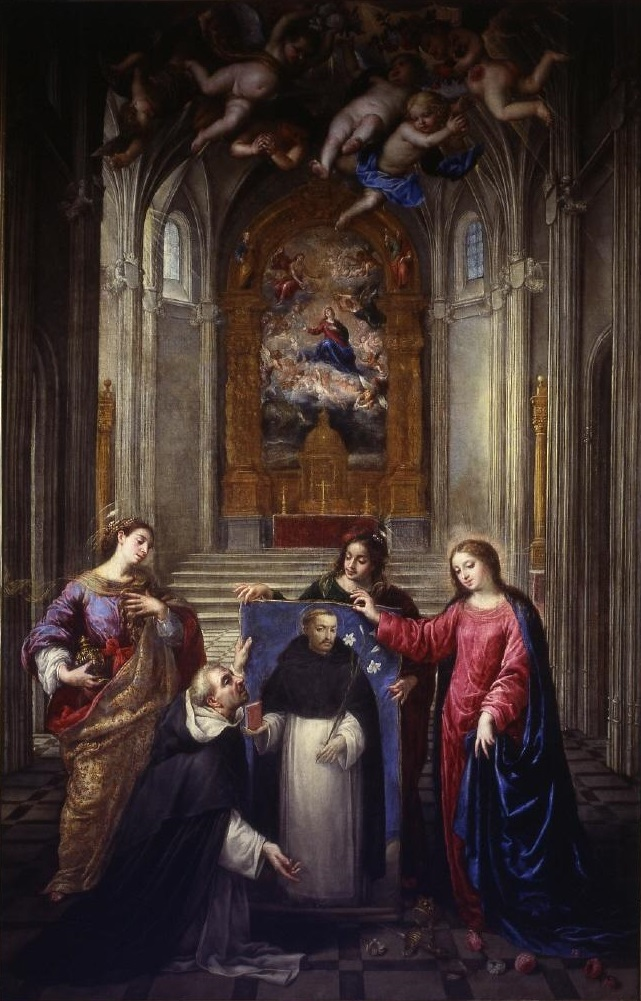
Antonio de Pereda

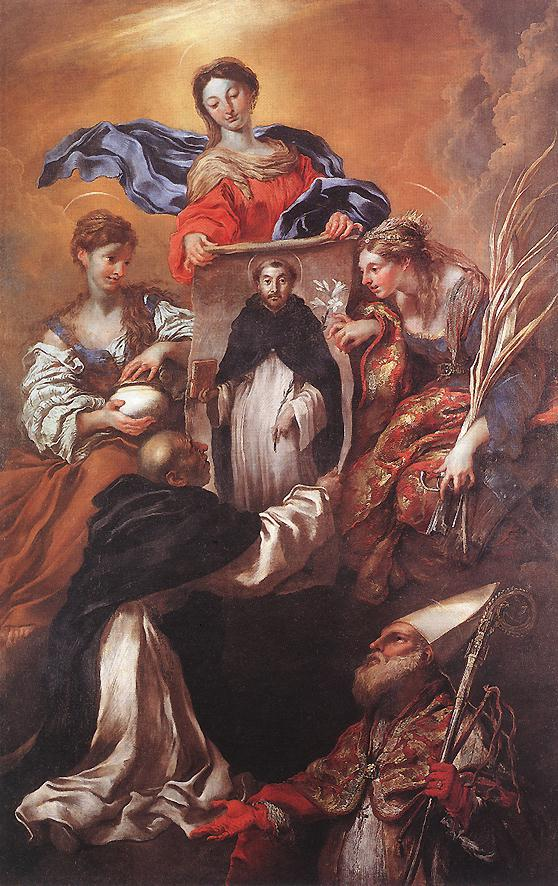
Giovanni Benedetto Castiglione

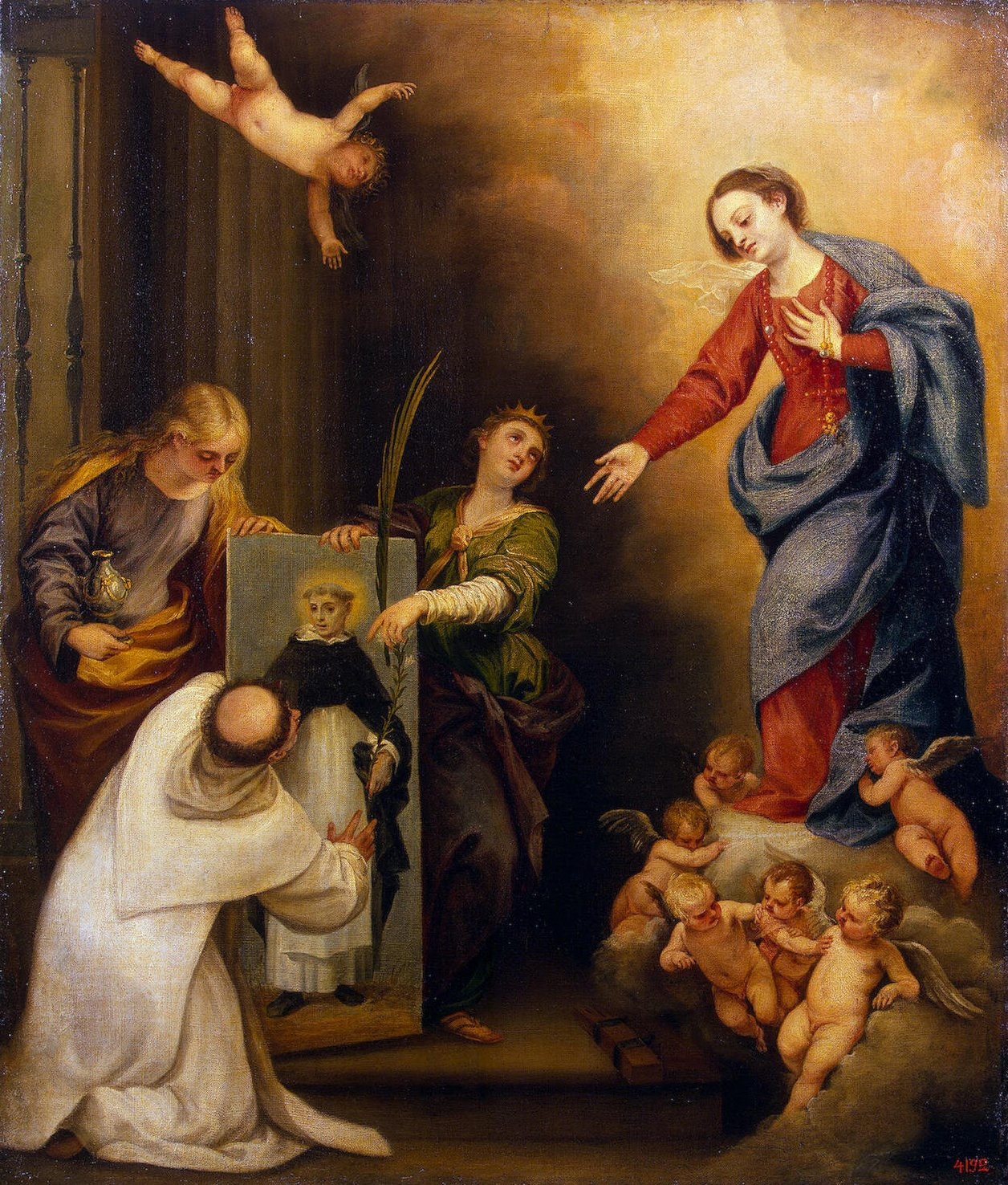
Pedro Atanasio Bocanegra

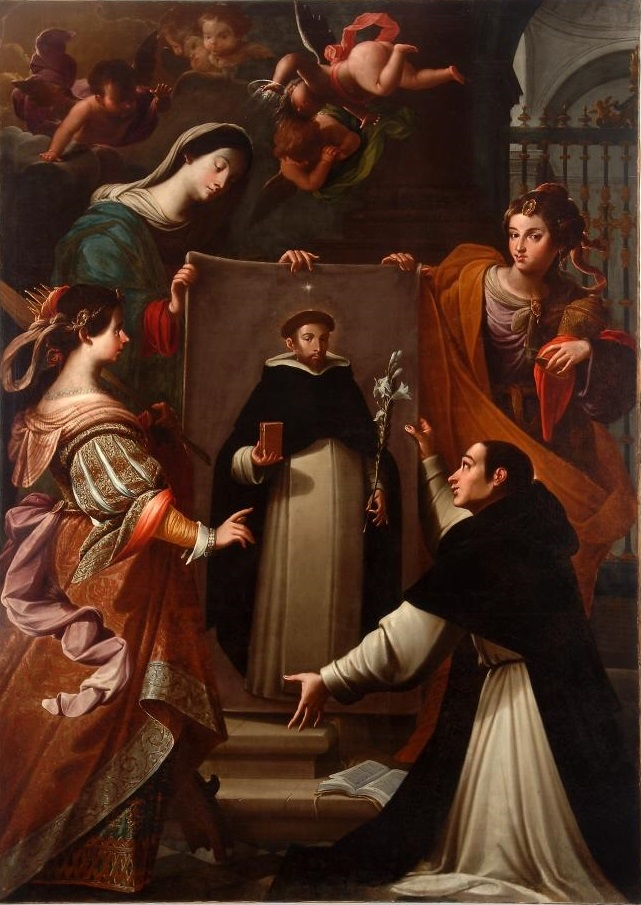
Andrés Amaya

== Ecclesiastical buildings ==
Ecclesiastical buildings named after, and dedicated to Saint Dominic in Soriano include (arranged by date):

- Iglesia de Santo Domingo, a church in Tenerife, Canary Islands, on the site of the former Convent of Santo Domingo Soriano (founded 1649).
- Chiesa di San Domenico Soriano, a church in Naples (founded 1673).
- Santo Domingo de Soriano, a church in Villa Soriano, Uruguay (building begun 1751).
