= Portrait of a Lady (Moroni) =

Painting by Giovanni Battista Moroni

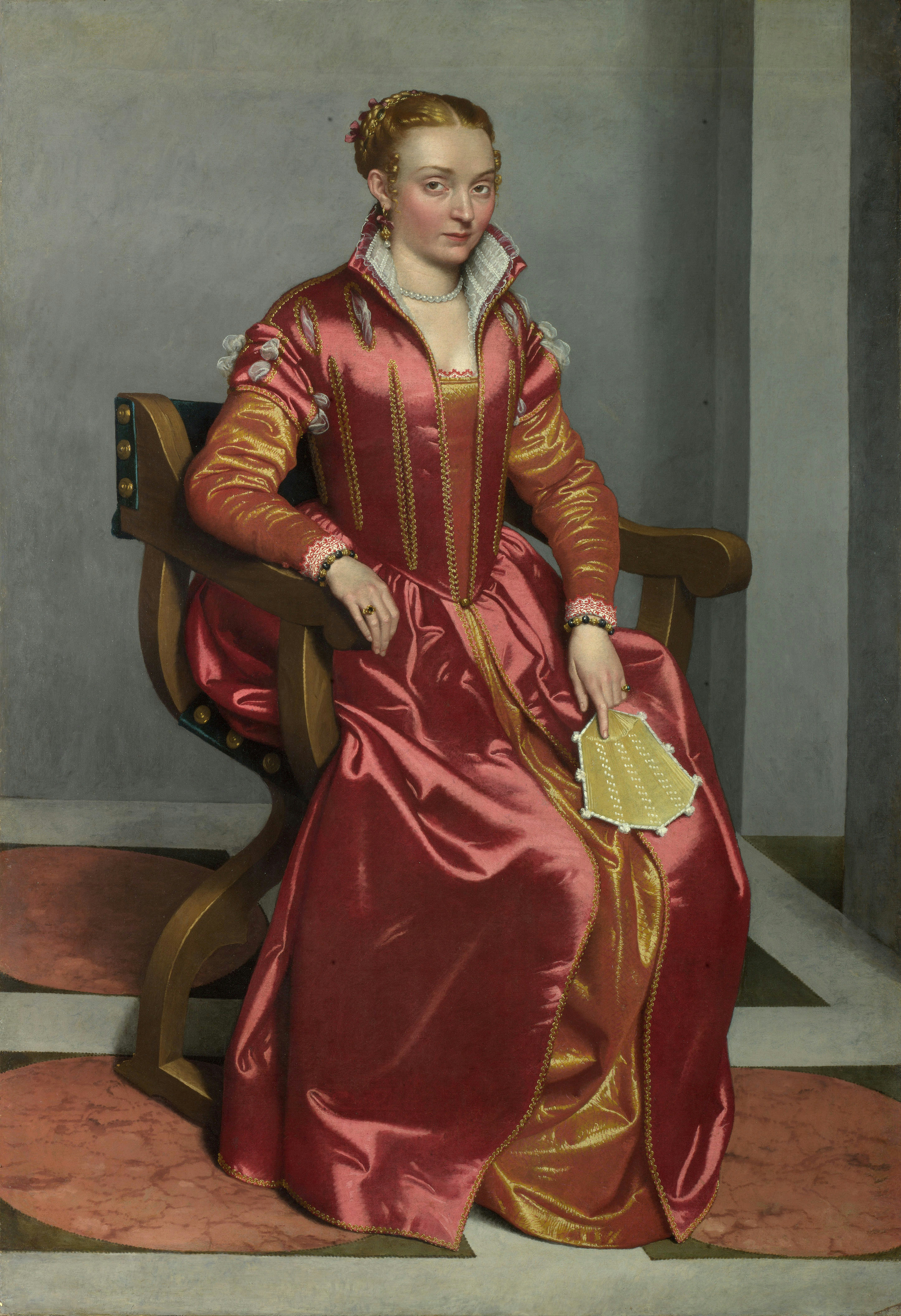
- Artist: Giovanni Battista Moroni
- Year: c. 1556-1560
- Medium: oil on canvas
- Dimensions: 154.6 cm × 106.7 cm (60.9 in × 42.0 in)
- Location: National Gallery, London

Portrait of a Lady, also known as The Lady in Red (Italian: Dama in Rosso) is an oil on canvas painting by Italian painter Giovanni Battista Moroni, from c. 1556–1560. It is believed to depict Countess Lucia Albani Avogadro, a 16th-century Italian poet. It is held in the National Gallery, in London.

== History ==
Lucia Albani Avogadro was a Renaissance poet born in Bergamo in 1530, the wife of Faustino Avogadro, a nobleman from Brescia, of whom she was widowed in 1564. She was known for her beauty, intelligence and wisdom. Her husband is believed to have died of a fall from a balcony, leaving her a widow some years before her own death, in 1568, of tuberculosis.

Moroni frequented the Albani Avogadro family during his years in Brescia; in fact, the painting can be dated from 1555 to 1560, certainly after the death of Moretto da Brescia, the artist's master, but he also frequented the Albanis in Bergamo.

== Description ==
The painting depicts Lucia Albani Avogadro, sitting sideways on a chair, with her right arm on the armrest, at the left, and her left arm on her dress while she holds a golden fan in her hand. What immediately catches the viewers eye in the painting is the bright pinky-orange shimmering of the open overcoat on her brocade dress, like the sleeves. Following the Spanish fashion of the 16th century, her sumptuous dress is rich in embroidery and golden stitching. A white collar of very fine lace and a necklace of white pearls act as a change of color from the dress, which also appears on the young woman's cheeks, and in the golden hairstyle. The hanging ear with a small white pearl acts as a set with the necklace. The polychrome marble floor also mirrors the gray colors of the back wall and the pinky-orange of the dress, enhancing them. Everything is meant to express a great richness and elegance, if it weren't for the somewhat upset and amused look and apparent blush of the young lady, like if she was made uncomfortable by having been portrayed so richly dressed. The model pose variations, compared to the artist's previous portraits, seems an improvement, with the more minute proportion of the head and a higher perspective, refining the whole, and thus presenting a more elegant work.

In the restoration of 1975 it was ascertained that the painting was enlarged both in the upper part by 8.8 cm and in the lower part by 6.30 cm: these parts were then covered by the frame but they were supposed to give more space to the portrait. There is no certainty that the painting depicting The Knight with the Wounded Foot, also by Moroni, represents Albani's husband, Faustino Avogadro, even if the two canvases differ in size by only a few millimeters, and have the same framing technique.

== Provenance ==
The painting was part of the Fenaroli collection in Brescia. It is mentioned in 1857 by Charles Lock Eastlake, and was purchased by the antiquarian Giuseppe Baslini, who sold it to the National Gallery, in London, at the price of 5000 pounds, in 1876.
