= Villa Cetinale =

Coordinates: 43.301058°N 11.204564°E

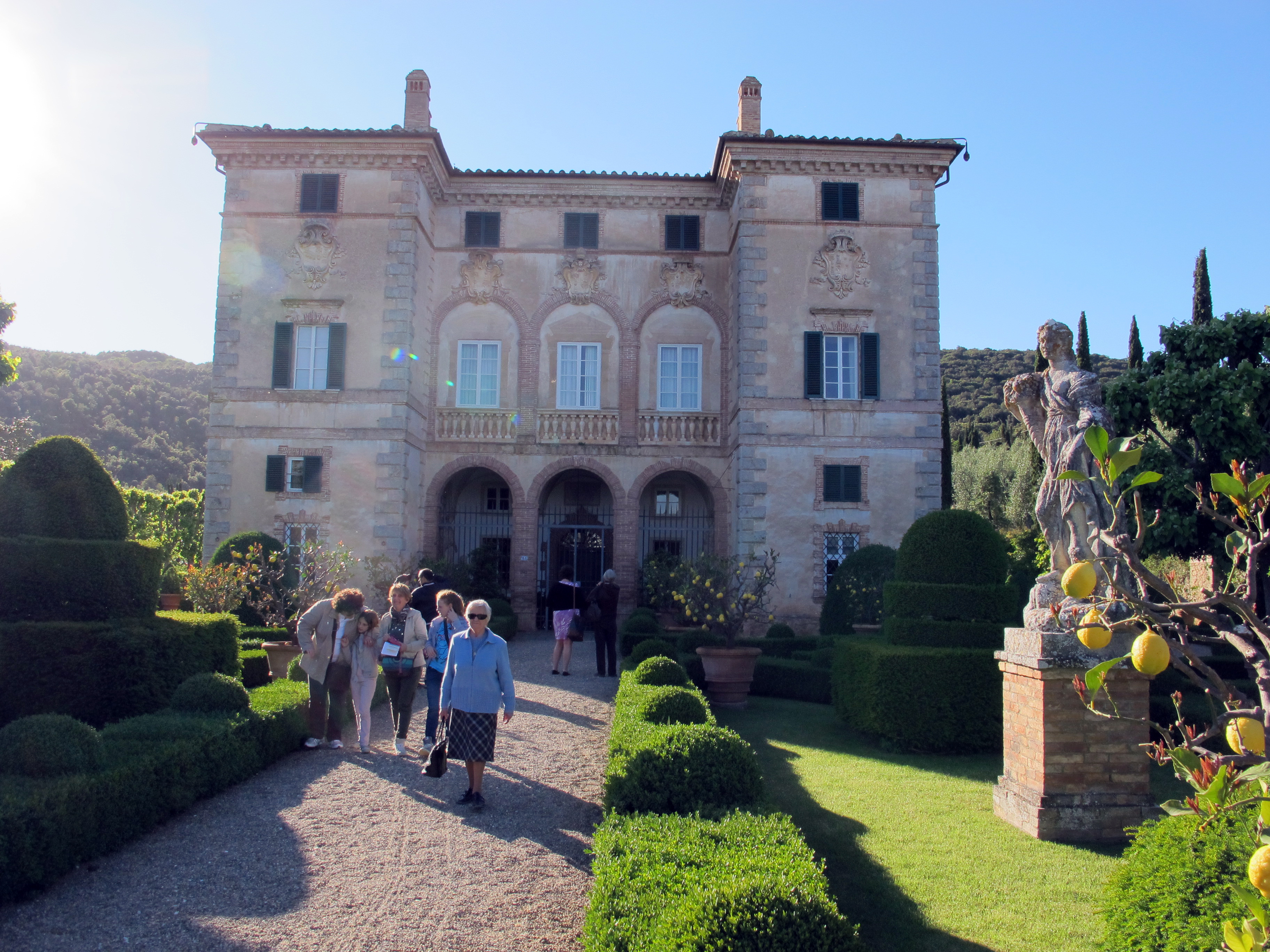

General information
- Architectural style: Baroque architecture
- Town or city: Cetinale
- Country: Italy

Design and construction
- Architect(s): Benedetto Giovannelli
- Main contractor: Pope Alexander VII; Flavio Chigi

Renovating team
- Architect(s): Antony Lambton

Website
- https://www.villacetinale.com/

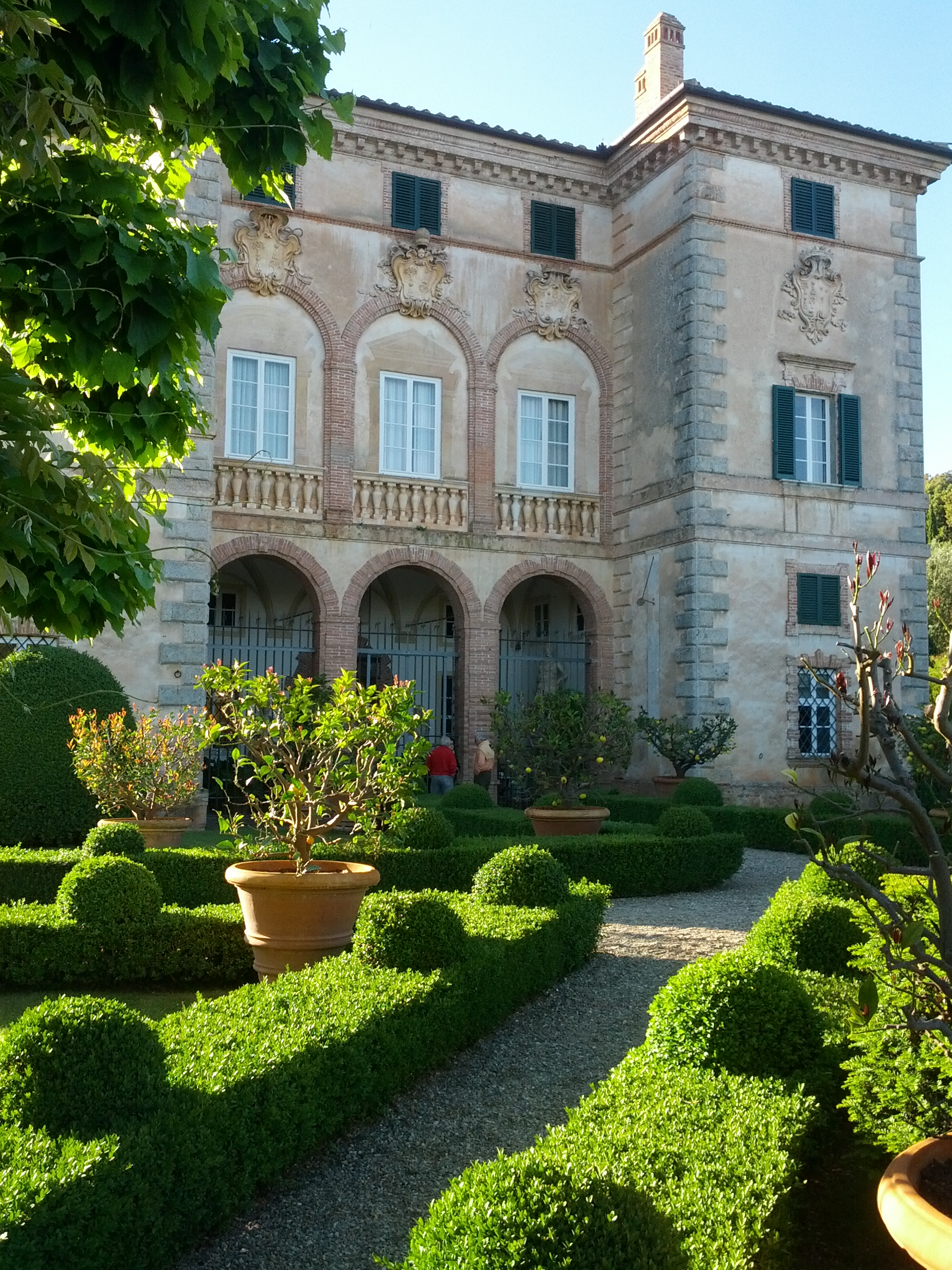
Villa Cetinale in Tuscany

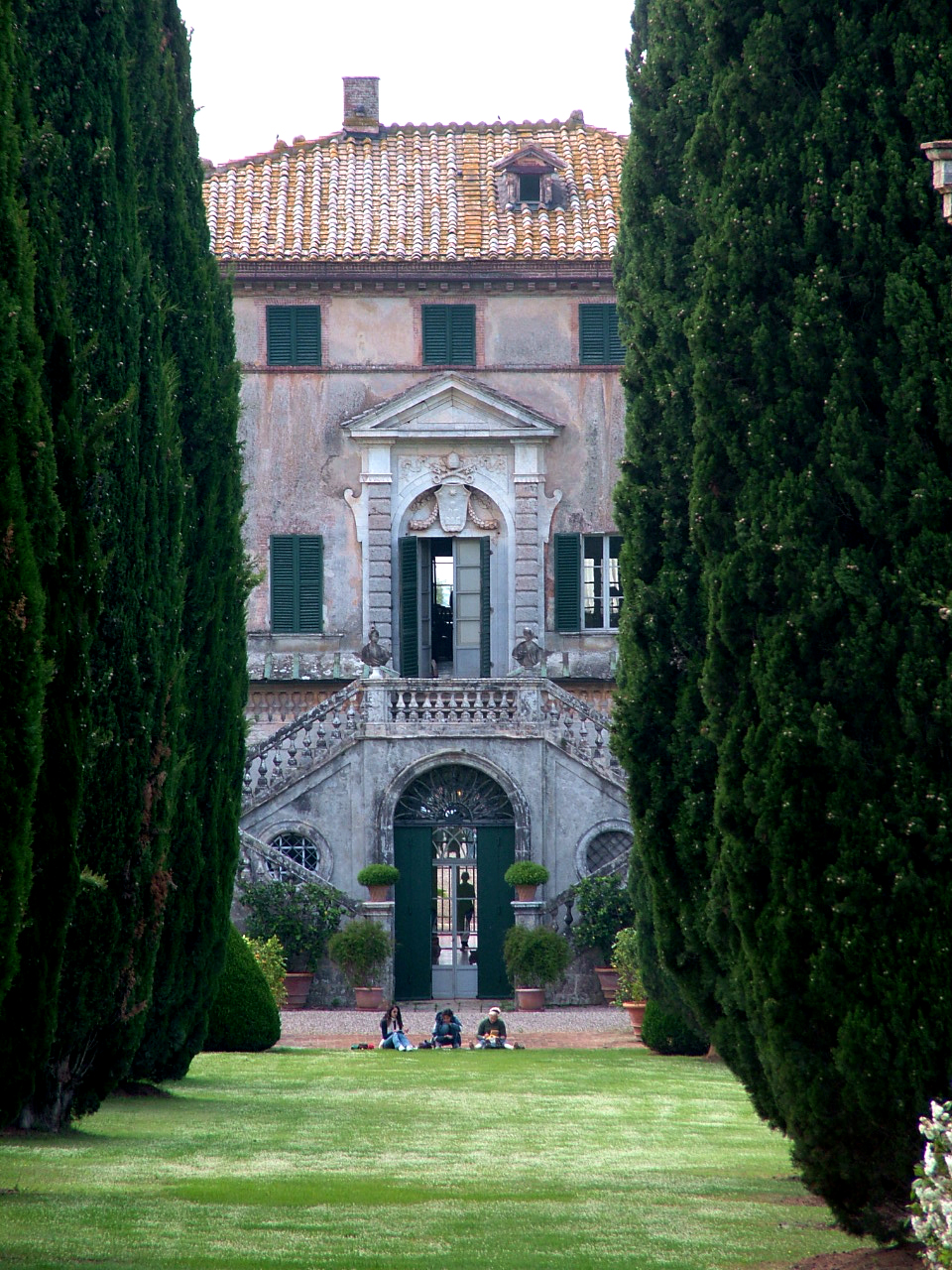
The villa's rear façade, with paired entry stairways to the piano nobile.

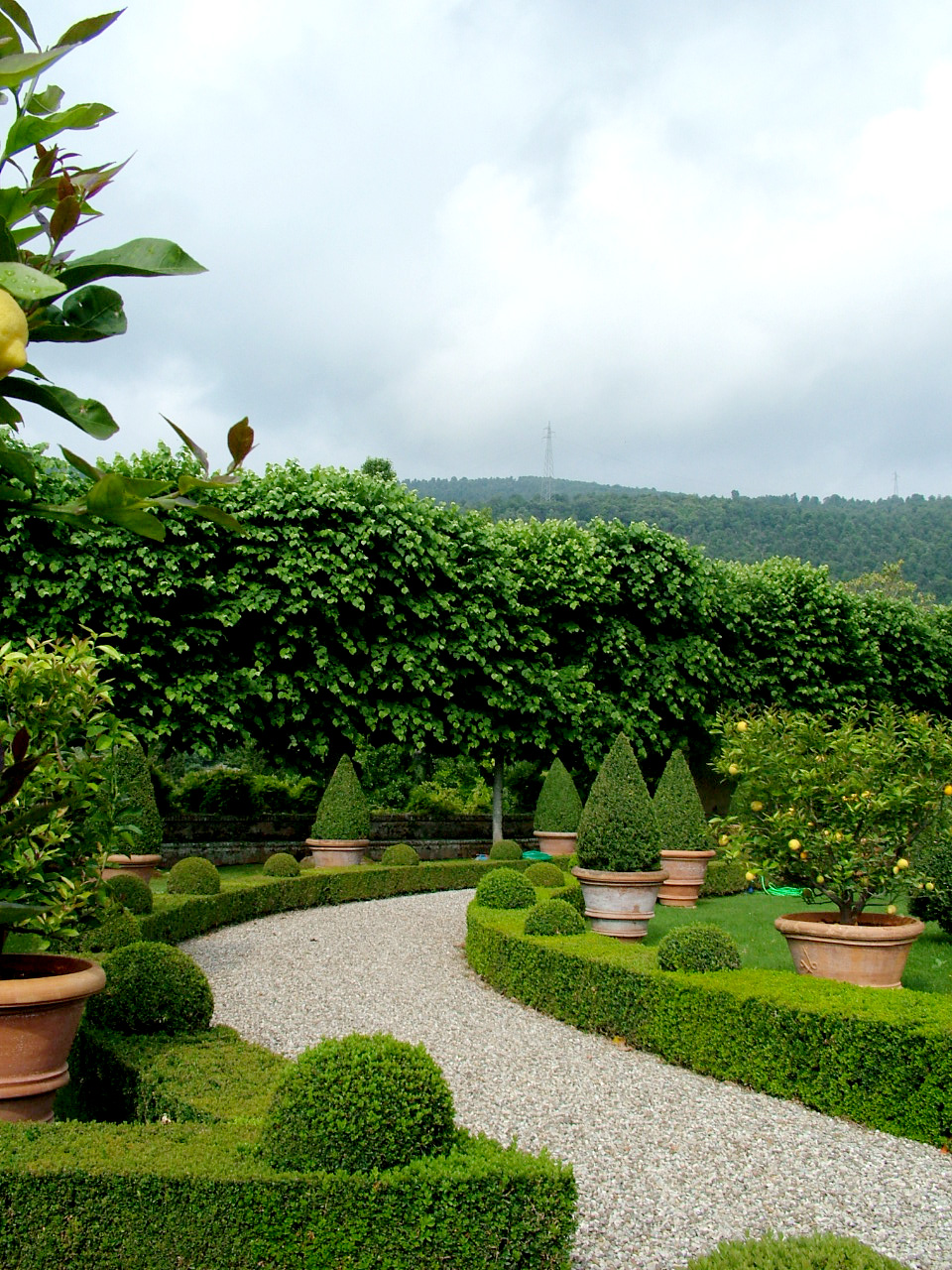
The Limonaia—potted lemon garden, at the villa's front.

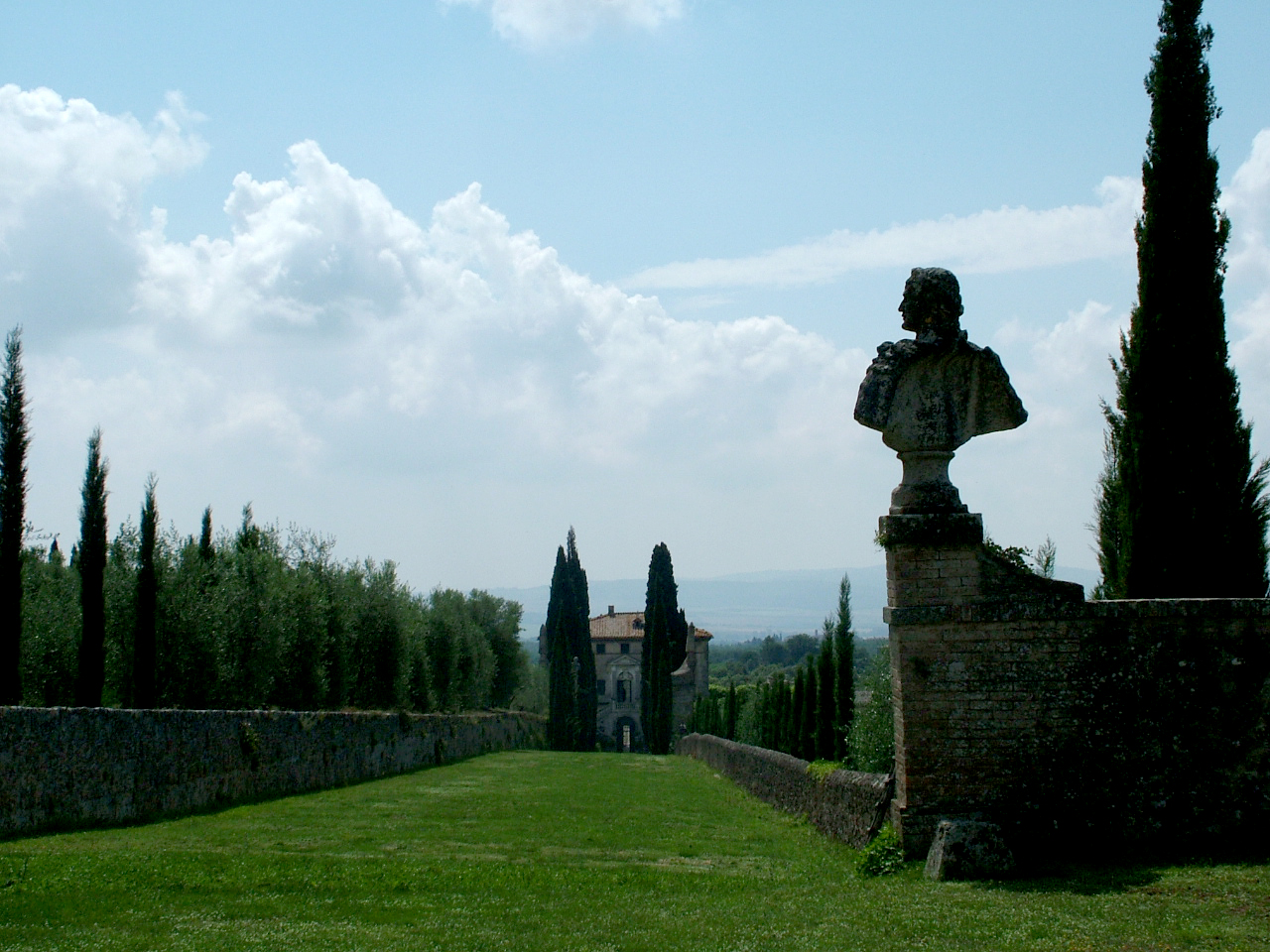
View from hill's base, along the avenue (allée) of garden axis, to villa.

Villa Cetinale is a 17th-century Baroque villa and Italian garden in Tuscany. The property is located in the hamlet of Cetinale near Sovicille, about 12 kilometres (7.5 mi) west of Siena, in Tuscany, Italy. The property is best known for the expansive gardens, arrayed in classic symmetry, as well as for its woodland gardens.

== History ==
=== 17th century ===
The residence was originally a modest building surrounded by farm dwellings, owned by Fabio Chigi (1599–1667). Chigi employed Benedetto Giovannelli, a local architect, to design the plans for a new villa, whose construction occurred between 1651 and 1655. After Fabio Chigi became Pope Alexander VII, in 1655, work came to a halt.

In 1676, the villa and lands were inherited by the Pope's nephew, Cardinal Flavio Chigi (1631–1693), Prince of Farnese, Duke of Ariccia and Prince of the Holy Roman Empire. Cardinal Chigi employed the architect Carlo Fontana in 1680 to redesign the villa, originally called Villa Chigi, and plan the gardens. Fontana was a former pupil of Gian Lorenzo Bernini. His design transformed the villa into the Roman Baroque style.

After the death of Cardinal Chigi in 1693 it passed into his family, the Chigi-Zondadari, who retained it into the late 20th century.

=== 20th century ===
Villa Cetinale, by then in a somewhat ruinous state, was acquired by British aristocrat Antony Lambton in 1977. Lambton retired there, following a personal scandal in England. For nearly three decades he meticulously restored the villa and the gardens' built features and plantings. He died in Siena in 2006. It is now available for private rental, with garden tours available by arrangement.

== Garden ==
=== Main axis ===
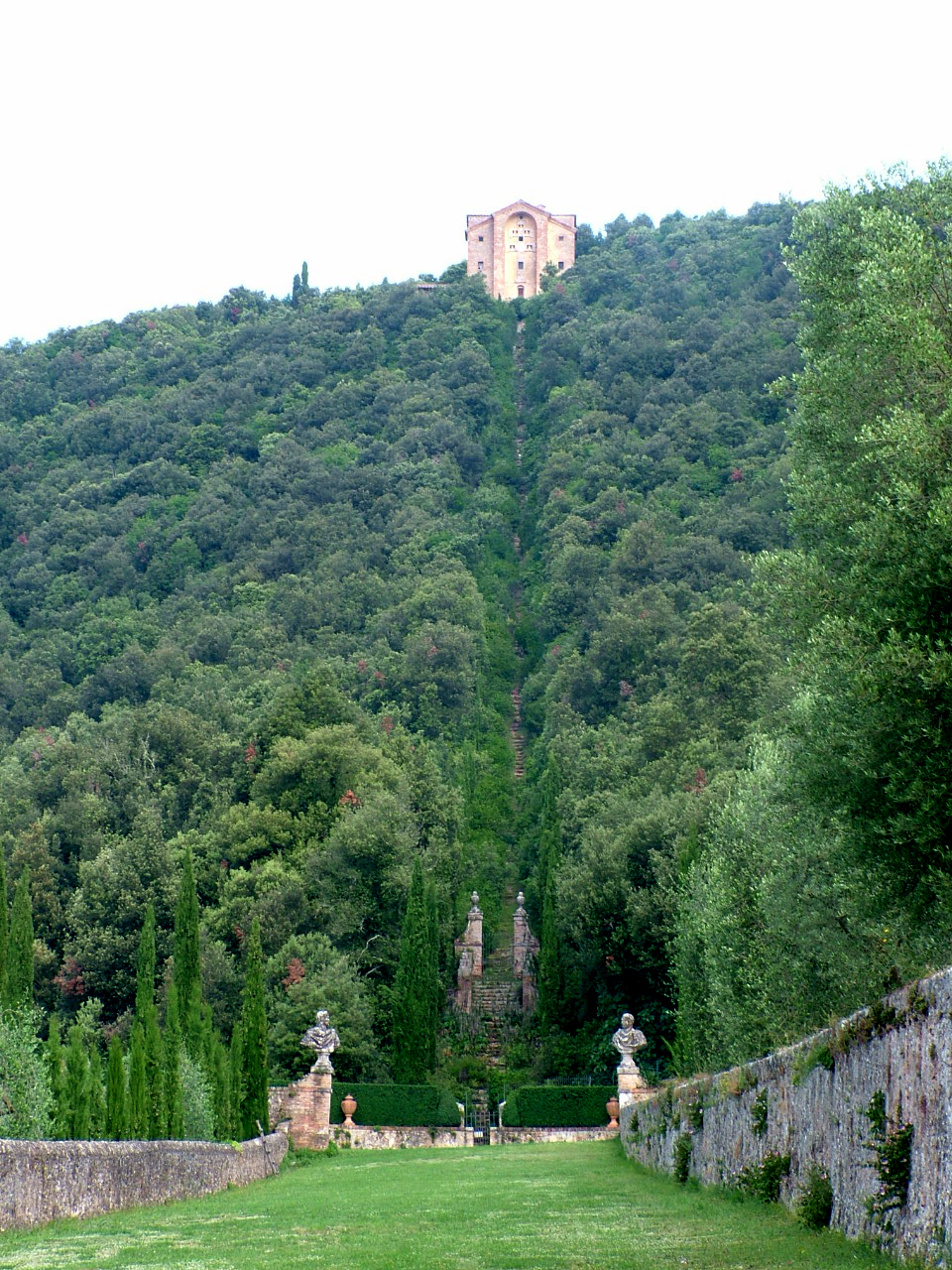
The garden axis view from near the villa to the hillside hermitage ("Romitorio") terminus.

The plan of the Villa Cetinale gardens is in the Giardino all'italiana style, with a strong solo primary axis.

It begins at the lower terminus far below the house, with a gigantic statue of Hercules. The axis extends across natural and landscape, and the midway immediate villa surroundings, to its upper terminus, a hermitage—Romitorio high on the hill above.

On axis at the front façade of the villa is a semi-walled potted lemon garden, accented with statues by Giuseppe Mazzuoli (1644–1725) and 'Baroque style' topiary. On axis at the rear façade a symmetrical double staircase rises to the primary villa entry, at the piano nobile ('floor one') level, following the Roman custom of reserving the ground floor unnumbered for the domestic service uses.

Behind the villa an avenue (allée) of Italian cypress (Cupressus sempervirens) defines the axis through gardens and fields to the base of the hill. A significant and very long stone stairway carries the axis up through the hillside's woodlands, to the focal point of the Romitorio.

=== Other elements ===
From beside the villa a secondary axis extends northeast across a balustraded terrace, and through an olive grove to a very tall masonry bell tower, with clock.

There are several original non-axial elements of the gardens. Northeast of the main axis beyond the bell tower a garden walkway proceeds around a hill, going through the 'Holy Woods' with stone statues and sculptures of animals, also by Giuseppe Mazuoli. West across the axis a long looping walkway passes through open woods past a series of religious shrines with statues. Olive groves are also part of the landscape surrounding the villa and long axis.

The Lambton restoration also developed new off-axis garden terraces and flower gardens beside the villa.

Publications

Villa Cetinale was one of the 70 gardens included by Edith Wharton in her 1904 book Italian Villas and Their Gardens, with illustrations and a plan of it. The garden is also included in the 1997 book Edith Wharton’s Italian Gardens by Vivian Russell, and featured on the cover.

== In popular culture ==
The villa features in the season three finale of the TV series Succession.

== See also ==
- Italian Renaissance garden
- Giardino all'italiana
- Garden à la française — Baroque garden style.
