= Albani family =

16th to 19th-century aristocratic Roman family

Albani
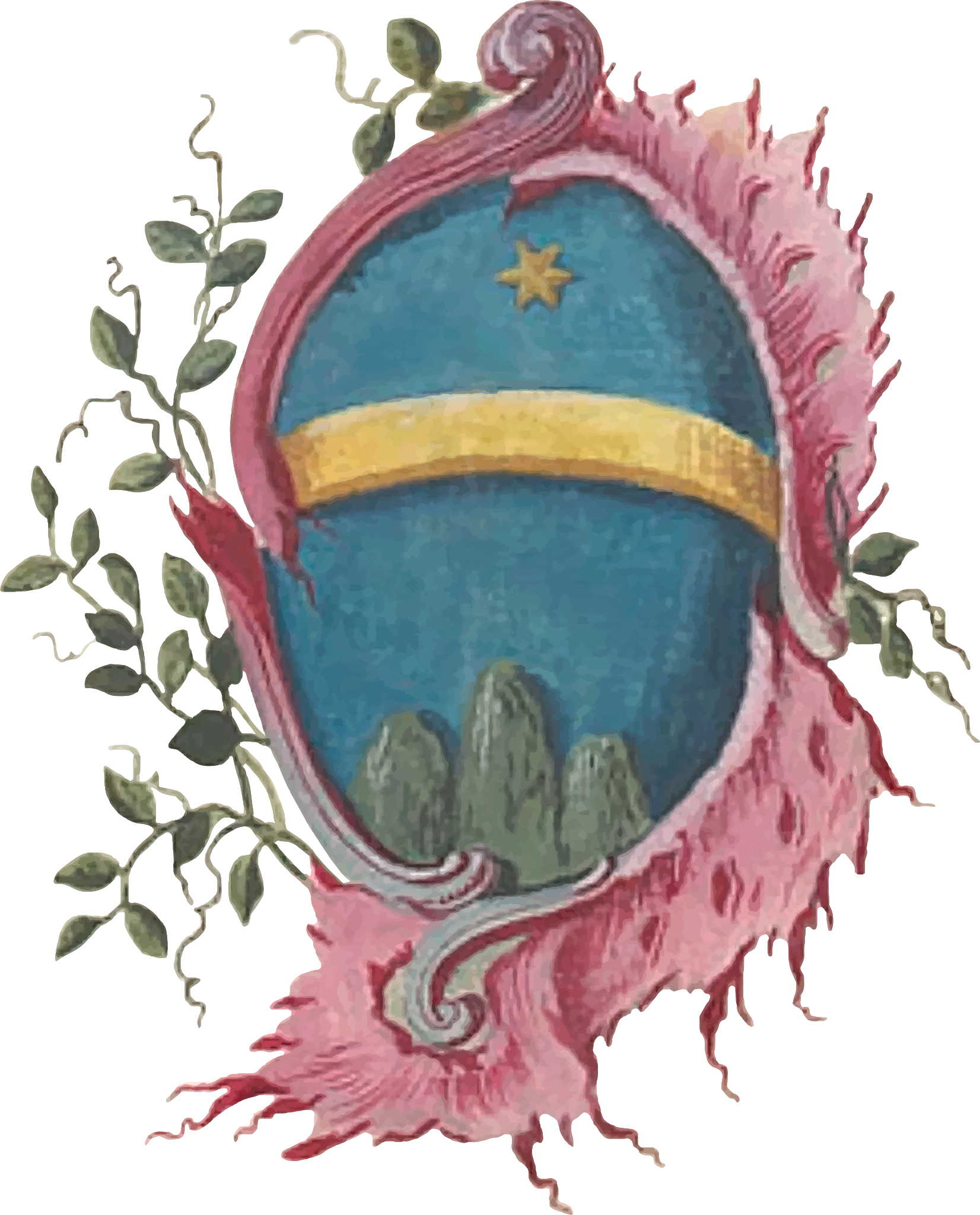
- Albani Family Coat of Arms
- Current region: Urbino, Italy
- Origin: Laç, Albania

The Albani were an aristocratic Roman family from the 16th to the 19th century. They were of Albanian origin and moved from northern Albania to Italy in the late 15th century. The Albani produced many high ranking figures of the Catholic Church, including Pope Clement XI. Their patrilineal heirs died out in 1852 and their estates were inherited via matrilineal descent by the Chigi, another aristocratic family of central Italy, hence known as the Chigi-Albani.

== Origin ==
The original name of the Albani was Lazzi (Laçi) which they changed to Albani in memory of their origin. Francesco Albani (Clement XI) funded an expedition in Albania to locate the exact settlement of his family's origins. In the final report, the two most probable locations which were presented to him were Laç near Lezhë and Laç near Kukës, both in northern Albania. The Albani family originated from Albania by two brothers, George and Fillip. After serving in the Albanian–Venetian War in the 15th century, they sought refuge in Italy, where they settled in Urbino and adopted the new surname "Albani". After a short while, they rose to high status and were trusted in many inner circles within the church and the government. One of the first and most prominent members of the family, Gian Girolamo Albani, started the family on the path to government affiliation. Many members of the family took after him and pursued government and church leadership.

== Influence ==
Back in 16th century Italy, the Albani Family were very influential, and in some ways, they still are. Many of the male family members reached out for positions in government and the church. With allegiance to their God and their country being so important to everyone in that era, the Albani family name gained a lot of respect and influence over the course of the years in many different fields.

=== Religious ===
Back in the Age of the Enlightenment in Italy, religion was everything. Every one followed the church and looked to the leaders of the church for guidance. The church held a lot of power back then, and there were many members of the family who held high positions in the Catholic Church.

=== Political ===
Though many of the family members held positions with the church, there were also a few that held government jobs. Many of them were cardinals or diplomats in their time, whilst some others dealt in the armed forces. One of the more prominent members of the family, Giovanni Girolamo Albani, was a cardinal and a vice commander of armed forces in the Serenissima Republic. Others dealt with foreign affairs such as Gian Francesco Albani.

=== Artistic ===
Though none of the family members were known artists, the family had a lot of pull in the artistic world. Much of the knowledge we have about the Albani' in the art world consists of purchased collections and controversy surrounding them. One of the major pieces they were associated with was a portrait of some of the major members of the family called "Sette Ritratti Albani". It's known as "one of the most compelling group portraits in Italy". An example of the controversy surrounding the family within the world of the fine arts is that one of the paintings the Albani owned, a portrait of one of its most prominent members, Gian Girolamo Albani. It caused conflict because in the beginning, no one recognized the subject of the painting, and questioned why he was wearing symbols of high ranking. He wore a lynx coat and a gold cross, symbolizing high status and rank, but no one knew who he was, or if he deserved to be dressed in such a fashion.

== Library ==
The Albani Family library, also known as the Clementine Library, was made and named for one of the most prominent members of the family, Giovanni Francesco Albani. The library contains over 10,000 printed books and pamphlets, which date from 1473 to the early nineteenth century, though the majority were printed in the 16th, 17th, and 18th centuries Over, 1,000 volumes in the collection relate to the history of Canon, Roman and Feudal Law. Many of these works are unique and exist nowhere else. Though the library originally existed in the house of Albani Family in Urbino, Italy, the Catholic University of America acquired the collection in 1928 and has worked to preserve its knowledge ever since.

== Notable members ==
- Alessandro Albani (1692–1779), Italian aristocrat and cardinal
- Annibale Albani (1682–1751), Italian cardinal
- Francesco Albani (1578–1660), Baroque painter
- Gian Girolamo Albani (1504–1591)
- Lucia Albani Avogadro (1534-1568), Poet
- Gian Francesco Albani (1720–1803), Roman Catholic cardinal
- Giovanni Francesco Albani (Pope Clement XI) (1649–1721)
- Giuseppe Albani (1750–1834), Roman Catholic cardinal
- Ludovico Chigi Albani della Rovere (1866 – 1951), Grand Master of the Sovereign Military Order of Malta
