= Pedro Atanasio Bocanegra =

Spanish painter

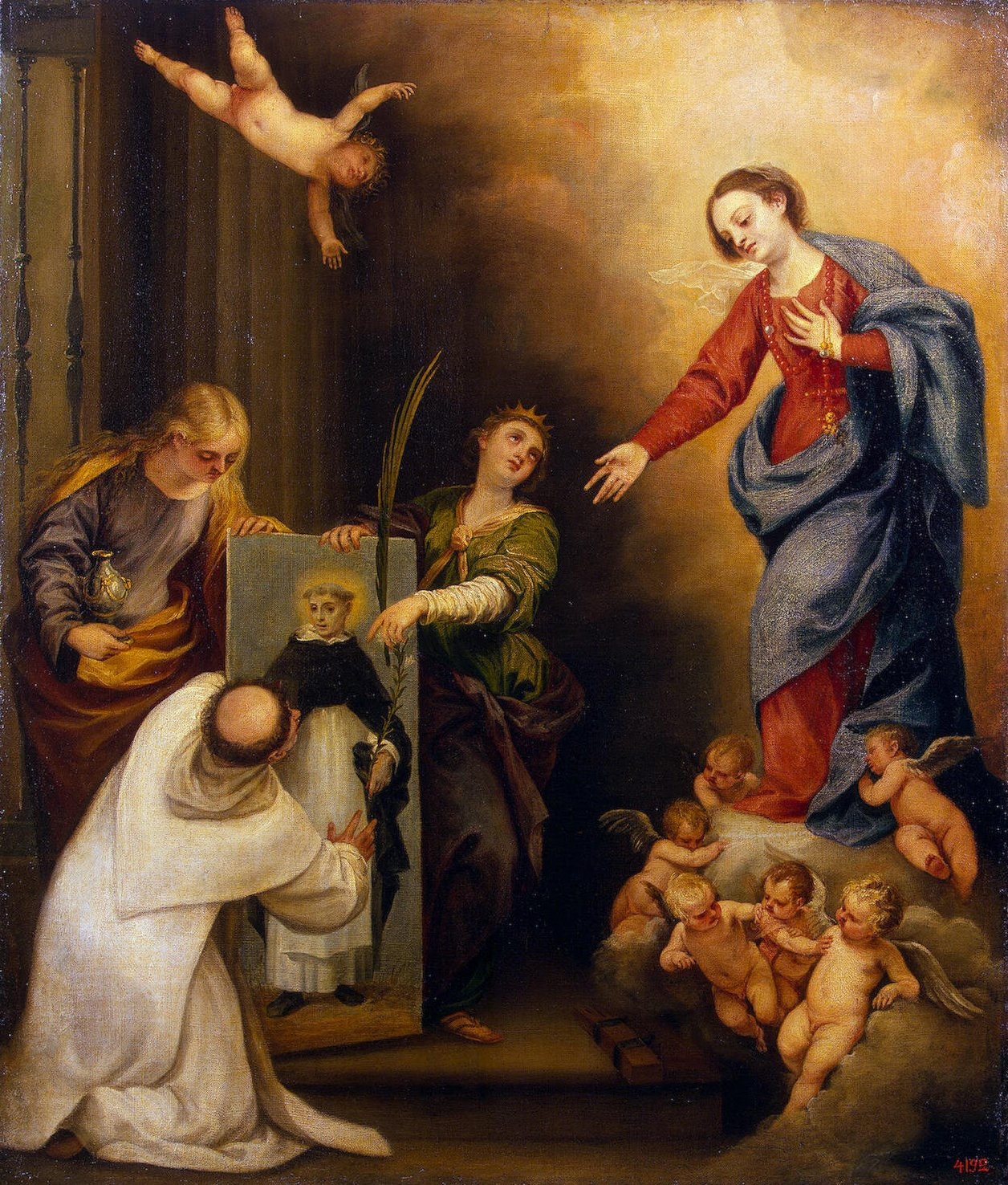
Saint Dominic in Soriano, ca. 1660, now in the Hermitage Museum.

Pedro Atanasio Bocanegra (12 May 1638 – 1688) was a Spanish painter, born at Granada.

== Biography ==
He was a scholar of Alonso Cano and Juan de Sevilla Romero, but, according to Palomino, improved himself in colouring by studying the works of Pedro de Moya and Van Dyck. In the cloister of Nuestra Senora de Gracia, at Granada, is a picture by him of the 'Conception,' and at the College of the Jesuits is one of his most esteemed works, representing the 'Conversion of St. Paul'. He was vain and arrogant, and boasted his superiority to all the artists of his time; but on being challenged to a contest of ability by Mathias de Torres, he slunk from the trial, and left Madrid. His works were, however, much coveted, and no collection was considered complete without a specimen. He died at Granada in 1688. The Death of St. Clara by him is in the Hermitage, St. Petersburg.

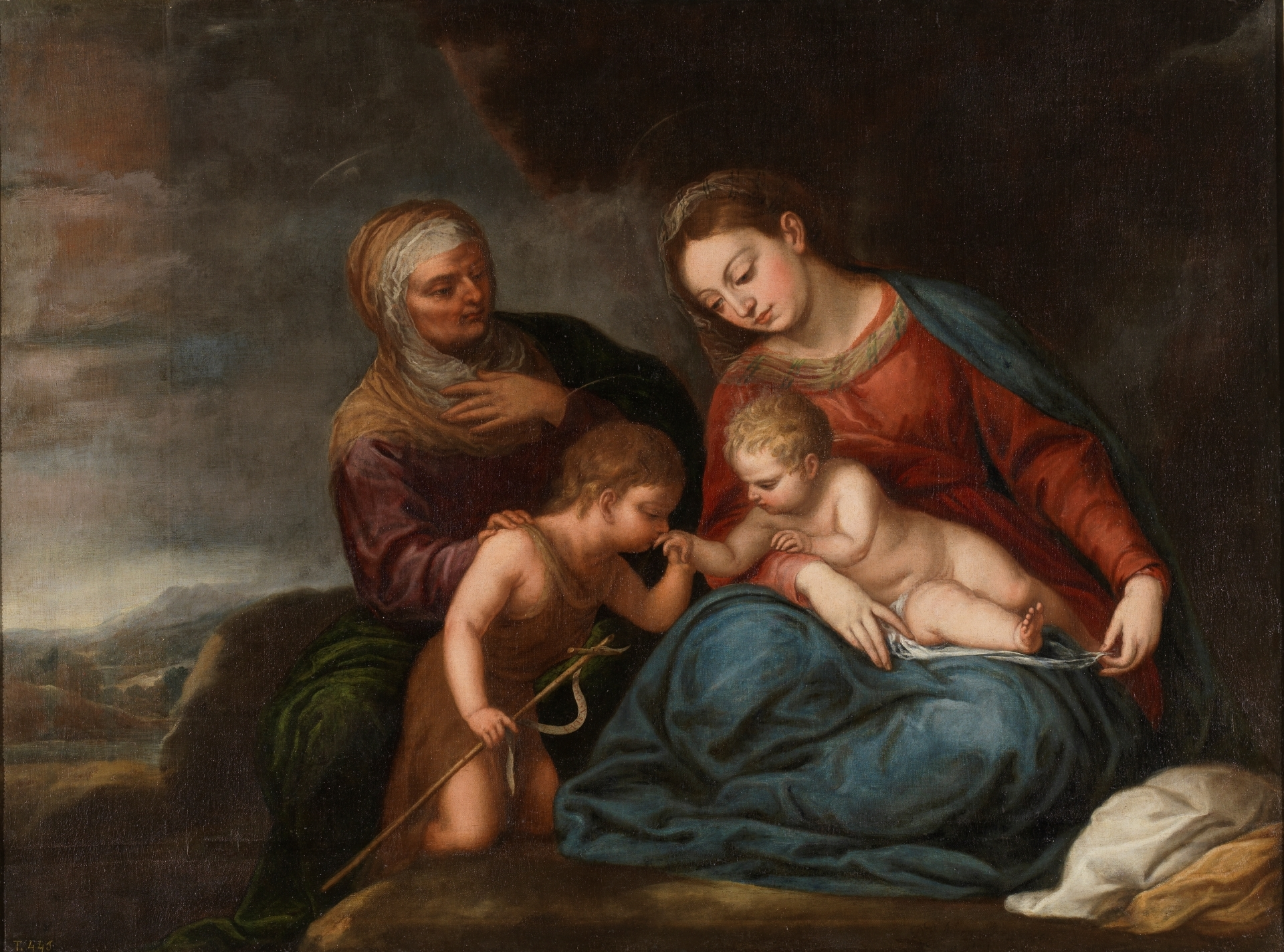
The Virgin with Child, Saint Elisabeth and John the Baptist, now at the Prado in Madrid.

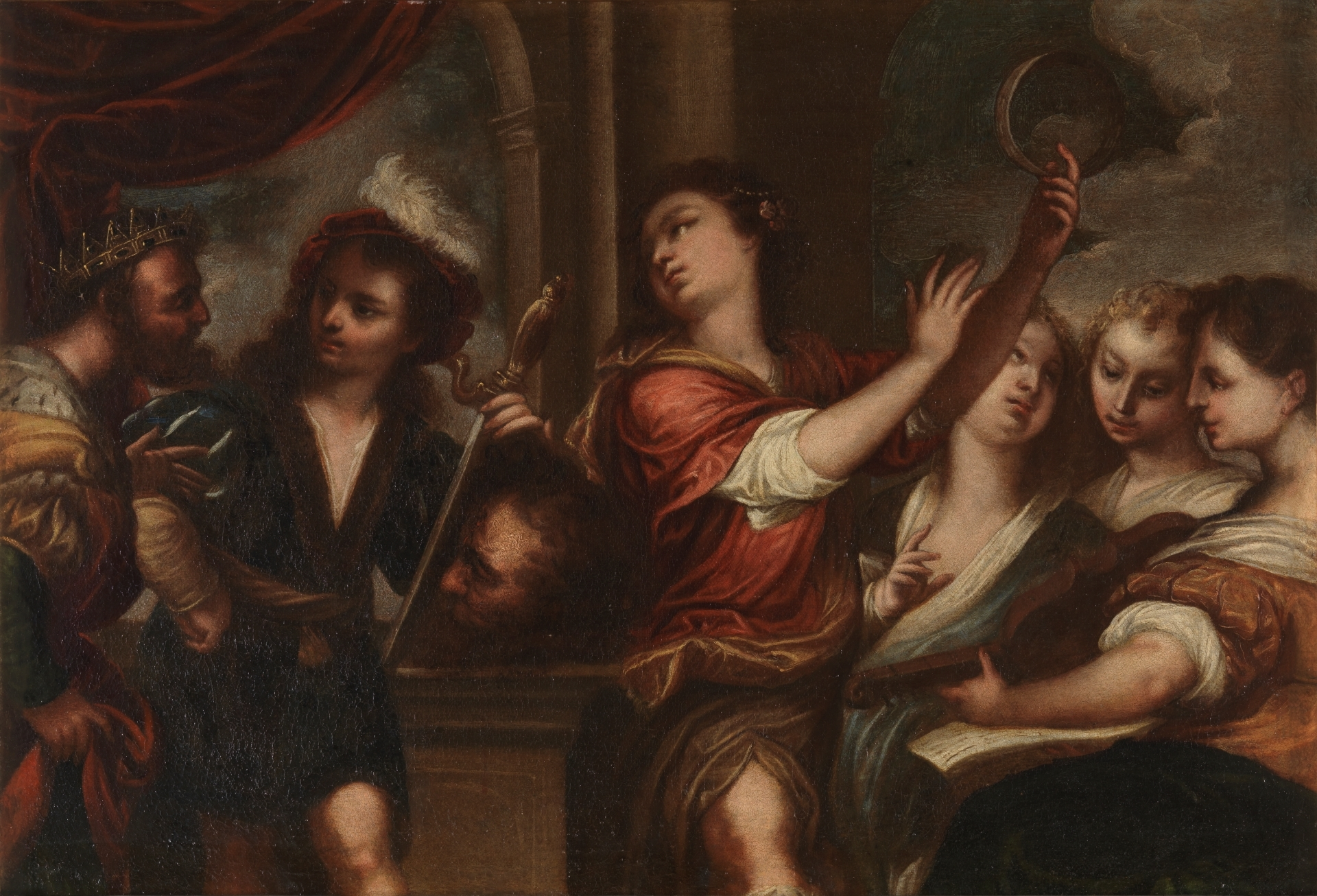
Triumph of David, now at the Prado in Madrid.

== Selected works ==
- Triumph of David (Triunfo de David) (Museo del Prado, Madrid)
- Virgin and Child with Saints Isabel and Hyacinth (Virgen con el Niño y Santa Isabel y San Juanito) (Museo del Prado, Madrid)
- Alegoría de la peste (Goya Museum, Castres)
- Immaculate Conception (Inmaculada Concepción) (Museo Diocesano de Arte Sacro, Vitoria)
- Adoration of the Eucharist (Adoración de la Eucaristia) (convento de las Góngoras, Madrid)
- Allegory of Justice (Alegoría de la Justicia) (1676, Academia de San Fernando, Madrid)
- Virgen con el Niño y retratos (Private collection, Madrid)
- Saint Felix of Valois (San Félix de Valois) (Santa Ana Chapel, Granada Cathedral)
- Saint John de Mata (San Juan de Mata) (Santa Ana Chapel, Granada Cathedral)
