= Lucia Albani Avogadro =

16th-century Italian poet

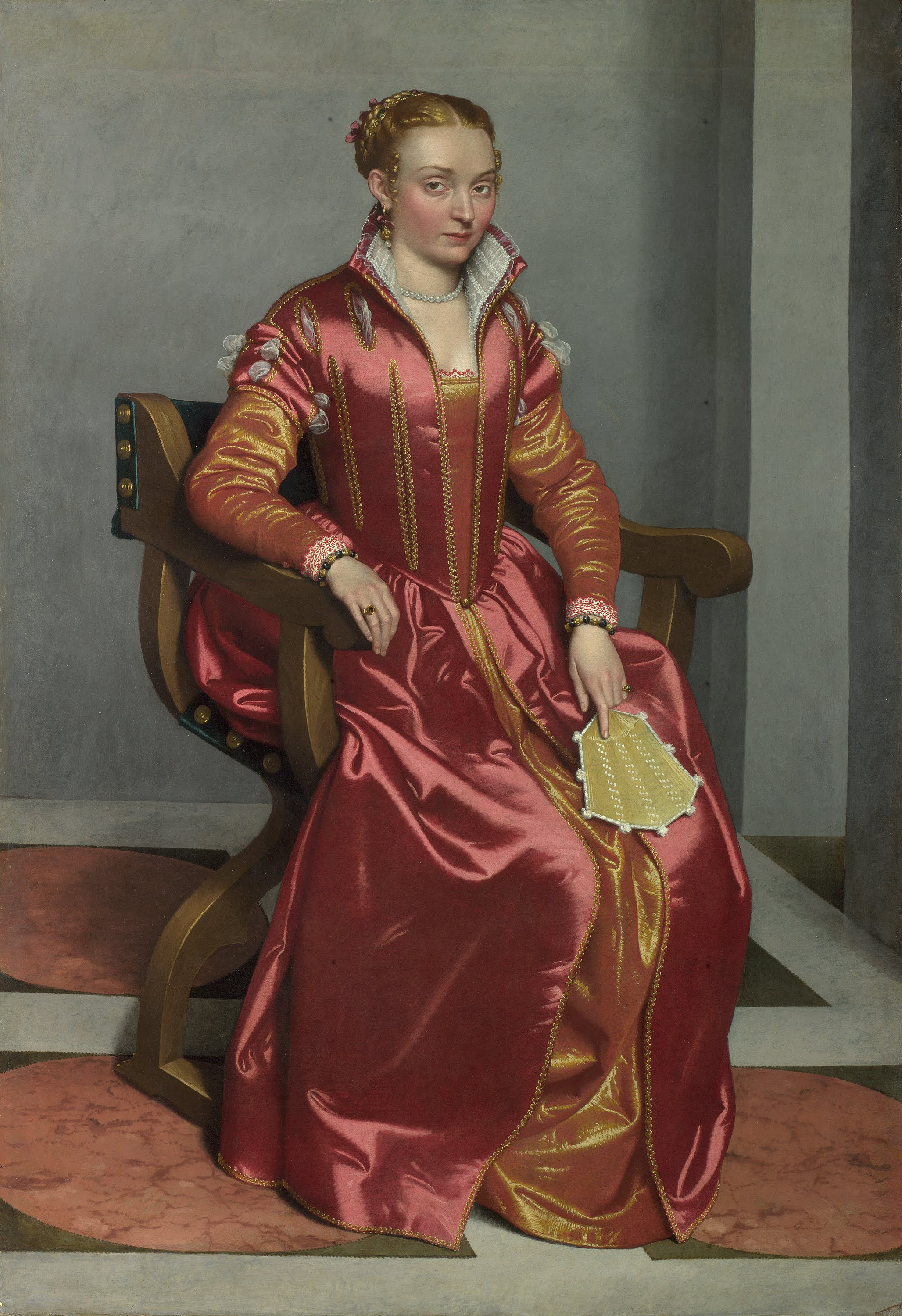
- Giovanni Battista Moroni, Portrait of a Lady, perhaps Contessa Lucia Albani Avogadro ('La Dama in Rosso')
- Born: 1534; Bergamo, Italy
- Died: 1568 (aged 33–34); Brescia, Italy
- Spouse: Faustino Avogadro
- Parents: Gian Girolamo Albani (father); Laura Longhi (mother)

Lucia Albani Avogadro (1534 – 1568) was an Italian poet, member of the Albanian Albani family.

== Biography ==
Born Lucia Albani in Bergamo, she had four brothers and two sisters, and was the daughter of Giovanni Gerolamo Albani – a jurisconsult, cardinal and governor of Bagnoregio – and Laura Longhi, herself the niece of Abbondio Longhi, secretary to Bartolomeo Colleoni.

Lucia married Faustino Avogadro, a member of the Brescian nobility, at the age of sixteen and settled in that city: well versed in letters, she was a member of the Accademia degli Occulti in Brescia and wrote Rime which was published in Venice in 1553.

She was involved in a dramatic family feud with the Brembati family, which led to the murder of Achille Brembati in 1563 in the church of Santa Maria Maggiore in Bergamo, resulting in the arrest of her brothers and father, and the exile of her husband to Ferrara, who was considered to be part of the plot. The young woman followed her husband into exile, but he died suddenly in 1564 after falling drunk from a balcony. She returned to Brescia where she died of tuberculosis, like her mother, in 1568.

Her sonnets were also appreciated by Girolamo Ruscelli who published two sonnets in his Rime di diversi eccellenti autori bresciani. Giovanni Battista Moroni depicted her in the famous painting Dama in Rosso.
