= Chigi family =

Italian princely family of Sienese origin

Chigi Chigi-Della Rovere
- Italian noble family
- Motto: "Micat In Vertice" (English: "It shines on the top")
- Country: Republic of Siena; Grand Duchy of Tuscany; Papal States; Kingdom of Italy
- Current region: Italy; European Union
- Origin: Republic of Siena
- Founded: 1492; 534 years ago (as noble family)
- Founder: Mariano Chigi
- Current head: Mario Chigi
- Titles: Pope (non-hereditary); Prince of the Holy Roman Empire (titular); Duke of Ariccia; Prince of Farnese; Prince of Campagnano
- Estates: Villa Farnesina (old seat); Palazzo Chigi (currently is the seat of the Council of Ministers and the official residence of the Prime Minister of Italy)

Arms of Agostino Chigi

The House of Chigi (IPA: [ˈkiːdʒi]) is an Italian princely family of Sienese origin descended from the counts of Ardenghesca, which possessed castles in the Maremma, southern Tuscany. Later, the family settled in Rome. The earliest authentic mention of them is in the 13th century, with one Alemanno, counsellor of the Republic of Siena.

== History ==
=== Origins ===
The first very prominent member was Mariano (1439–1504), a banker and two time ambassador of Siena to the Popes Alexander VI and Julius II. He founded the Roman branch of the family, the other branch was started by his brother, Benedetto.

== Notable members ==
Agostino Chigi (1465–1520) was the most famous member of the family during the Renaissance. He became an immensely rich banker, and built the palace and gardens afterwards known as the Farnesina, decorated by Raphael, Sebastiano del Piombo, Giulio Romano, and Il Sodoma, and was noted for the splendour of his entertainments. Pope Julius II made him practically his finance minister and gave him the privilege of quartering his own (Della Rovere) arms with those of the Chigi.

Cardinal Fabio Chigi, on being elected pope as Alexander VII at the Conclave of 1655, conferred the Roman patriciate on his family. His elder brother Mario, last commander of the Corsican Guard in Rome, continued the branch of the family in Siena. His brother Augusto continued the line in Rome. Augusto's son Agostino was made Reichsfurst (prince of the Holy Roman Empire) by Leopold I in 1659. Agostino married Maria Virginia Borghese (relative of the Borghese pope), and acquired the principalities of Farnese (1658), Campagnano (1661) and Ariccia, where a famous palazzo bearing the family name still stands. The pope also had two nephews who became cardinals, Flavio I, who was his Cardinal-Nephew and one of the main art collectors of the family and built the Villa Cetinale in 1680, and Sigismondo.

In 1712, Prince Augusto, son of Prince Agostino, received the dignity of hereditary marshal of the Church and guardian of the conclaves, which gave them a prominent ceremonial importance on the death of every pope. During the 18th century, Flavio II was created a cardinal.

On the marriage in 1735 of another Agostino Chigi (1710–1769) with Giulia Albani, heiress of the Albani, a Venetian patrician family, said to be of Albanian origin, her name was added to that of Chigi.

Prince Sigismondo Chigi Albani della Rovere (August 24, 1798 – May 10, 1877), Prince of Campagnano, had a son, Don Mario Chigi, and four daughters (Teresa, who married Giulio, Duca di Torlonia; Maria, who married Prince Giuseppe Giovanelli; Angiola, who married Conte Fabio Bonaccorsi; and Virginia, who married Marchese Galeazzo Guidi). Prince Sigismondo's brother, Flavio III (1810–1885), became a Cardinal on December 22, 1873 with the title of Santa Maria del Popolo; he had been Nuncio to France in the 1860s.

Prince Mario Chigi Albani della Rovere succeeded his father in 1877 and served as Marshal of the Holy Roman Church at the Conclave of 1878. He married Antonietta, the daughter of Prince Louis of Sayn-Wittgenstein-Sayn in 1857. They had three children, Agostino, Ludovico (Luigi) and Eleonora.

Prince Ludovico Chigi Albani della Rovere (July 10, 1866 – November 14, 1951), son of Prince Mario and Antoinette, was Grand Master of the Sovereign Military Order of Malta from 1931 to 1951. In 1893 he married Donna Anna Aldobrandini, Princess of Sarsina; they had three children, Sigismondo, Petro and Laura. Prince Ludovico was Marshal of the Holy Roman Church, and oversaw both the conclave of 1922 and that of 1939.

Prince Sigismondo Chigi (1894–1982), Hereditary Marshal of the Holy Roman Church, was the son of Prince Ludovico Chigi Albani della Rovere (1866–1951) and Donna Anna Aldobrandini, princess of Sarsina. He had one son, Don Agostino Chigi Albani della Rovere (1929–2002) and one daughter, Princess Francesca, with his wife, Marian Berry, an American heiress. He was the Marshal of the Conclave both in 1958 and 1963. The office, to which the Chigi had succeeded after the extinction of the Savelli in 1712, was abolished by Pope Paul VI in a motu proprio, Pontificalis Domus, of March 28, 1968.

The family owns large estates at Siena. The family palace on the Via del Corso in Rome is currently seat of the Italian government. Another Palazzo Chigi in Ariccia is now a museum and site for meetings. The family's mausoleum is in the Chigi Chapel of the Basilica of Santa Maria del Popolo in Rome, the work of Raphael and Gian Lorenzo Bernini.

The princely family is represented by Prince Mario Chigi Albani della Rovere, Prince of Farnese (b. 1929), whose heir is Prince Flavio Chigi Albani della Rovere (b. 1975)

== See also ==
- List of banks in Italy
