= Gian Girolamo Albani =

Italian Cardinal

His Eminence Gian Girolamo Albani
- Cardinal-Priest of San Giovanni a Porta Latina
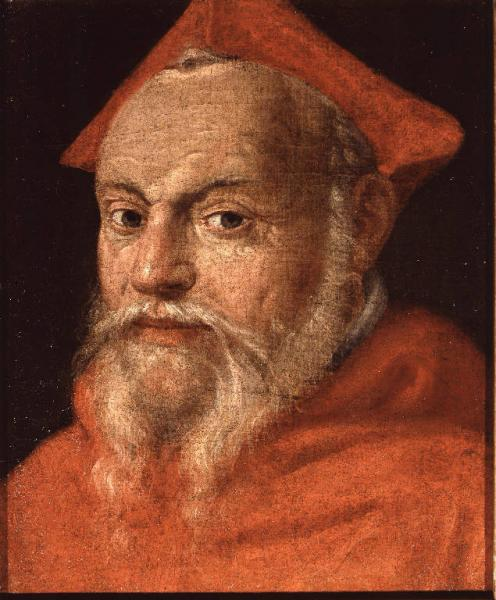
- Church: Catholic Church
- Appointed: 20 November 1570
- Term ended: 15 April 1591
- Predecessor: Alessandro Crivelli
- Successor: Ottavio Paravicini

Orders
- Created cardinal: 17 May 1570 by Pope Pius V
- Rank: Cardinal-Priest

Personal details
- Born: 3 January 1509 Bergamo, Lombardy
- Died: 25 April 1591 (aged 82) Rome, Papal States
- Buried: Santa Maria del Popolo

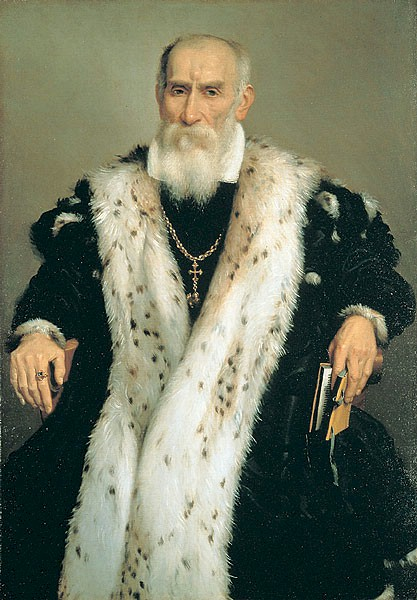
Portrait of cavaliere aurato di casa Albani by Giovanni Battista Moroni.

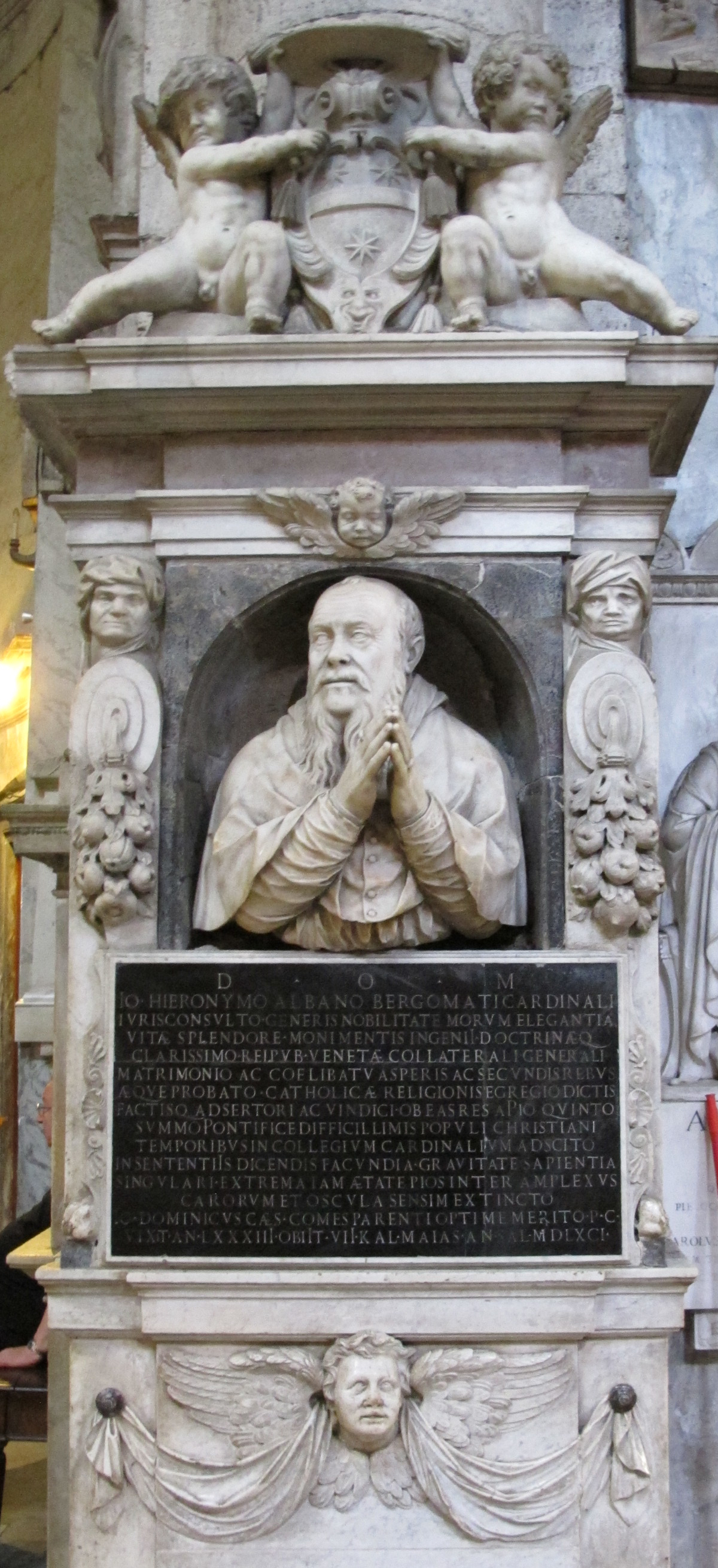
Monument to Albani in Santa Maria del Popolo.

The coat of Arms attributed to Albani.

Gian Girolamo Albani (1509–1591) was an Italian Roman Catholic cardinal.

== Biography ==
A member of the aristocratic central-Italian Albani family of Albanian origin, Gian Girolamo Albani was born in Bergamo on 3 January 1509, the son of Count Francesco Albani. He studied grammar and rhetoric under Giovita Rapicio da Chiari at the University of Padua; he later received a doctorate in civil law from the university in 1529.

After university, he returned to Bergamo. There, Andrea Gritti, Doge of Venice gave him the honor cavaliere aurato. He went on to serve as collaterale generale in the army of the Republic of Venice. He then became podestà of Bergamo. In 1550, he became magistrate in Bergamo; during this period he made the acquaintance of Michele Ghislieri (the future Pope Pius V).

The Albani family had long engaged in a feud with the Brembati family. This climaxed in 1563, when the sons of the Albani murdered Count Achille Brembati in Santa Maria Maggiore, Bergamo. The Council of Ten sentenced Albani and his brothers to five years exile on the island of Lesina. Albani's wife died while he was serving this sentence.

After completing his sentence, Albani accepted an invitation from Pope Pius V to come to Rome. The pope soon named him a protonotary apostolic. He served as governor of the March of Ancona from 3 February 1569 until May 1570.

Pope Pius V made him a cardinal priest in the consistory of 17 May 1570. He received the red hat and the titular church of San Giovanni a Porta Latina on 20 November 1570.

He participated in the papal conclave of 1572 that elected Pope Gregory XIII. The new pope sent him on a number of diplomatic missions, including one to form an alliance of Christian princes against the Ottoman Empire. He was a participant in the papal conclave of 1585 that elected Pope Sixtus V. From 1585 to his death, he was the governor of Bagnoregio. In 1586, his son, Giovanni Battista Albani, became Titular Patriarch of Alexandria. He participated in both the papal conclave of September 1590 that elected Pope Urban VII and the papal conclave of October–December 1590 that elected Pope Gregory XIV.

He died in Rome on 25 April 1591. He was buried in Santa Maria del Popolo.

== Works by Gian Girolamo Albani ==
- De donatione Constantini (Cologne, 1535)
- De cardinalatu (Rome, 1541)
- De immunitate ecclesiarum (Rome, 1553)
- De potestate papæ et concilii (Lyon, 1558)

== See also ==
- Catholic Church in Italy

Records
Preceded by Georges d'Armagnac	Oldest living Member of the Sacred College; July 1585 - 15 April 1591	Succeeded by Gaspar Quiroga y Vela
