= Flavio Chigi (1631–1693) =

Italian cardinal and librarian (1631–1693)

His Eminence Flavio Chigi
- Cardinal-Bishop of Porto e Santa Rufina
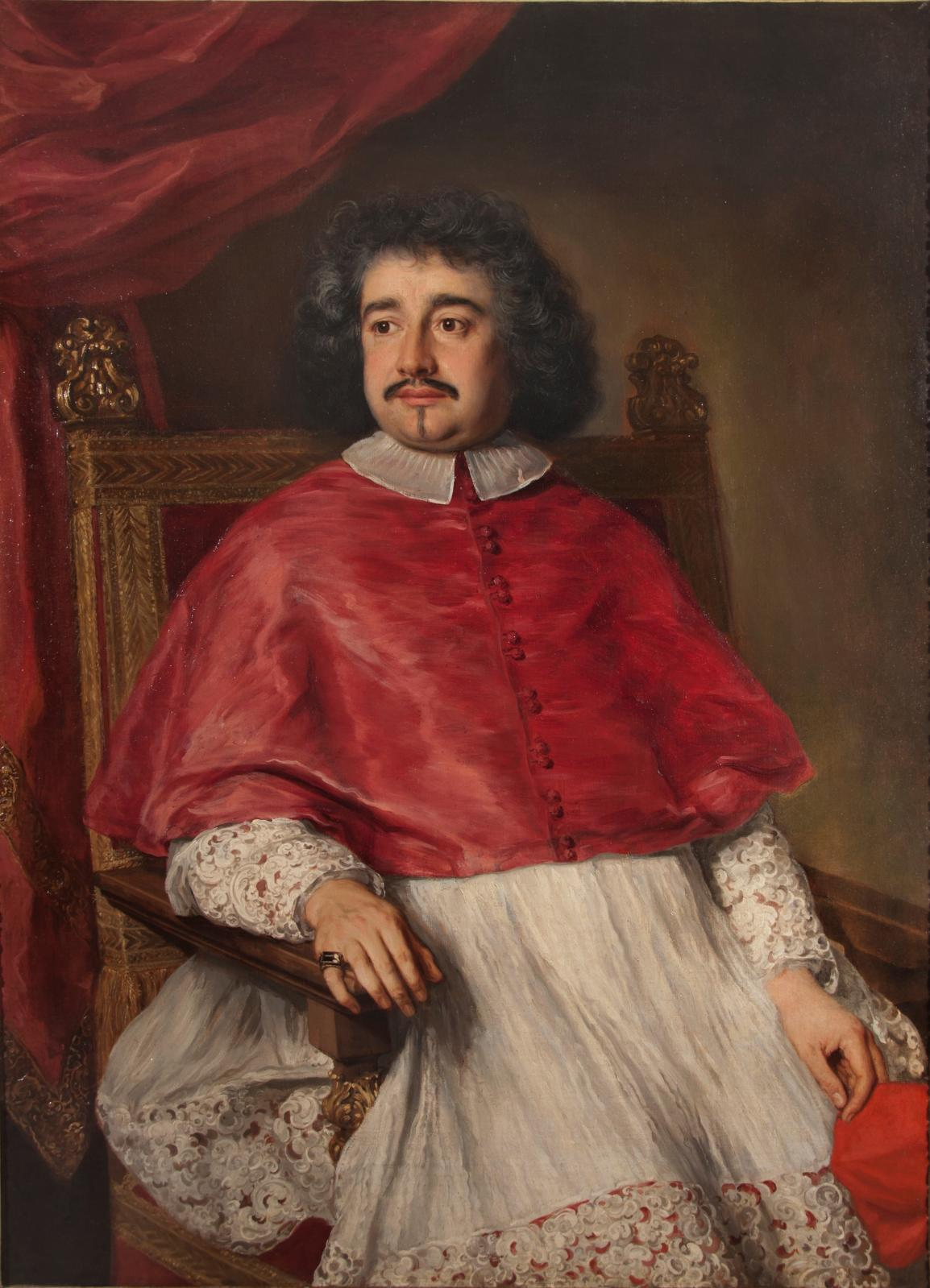
- Cardinal Flavio Chigi, by Jacob Ferdinand Voet
- Diocese: Porto e Santa Rufina
- See: Porto e Santa Rufina
- Appointed: 19 October 1689
- Term ended: 13 September 1693
- Predecessor: Pietro Vito Ottoboni
- Successor: Giacomo Franzoni
- Other posts: Archpriest of the Archbasilica of St. John Lateran (1666–1693); Prefect of the Roman Curia (1661–1693)
- Previous posts: Cardinal-Priest of Santa Maria del Popolo (1657–1686); Librarian of the Vatican Library (1659–1661); Prefect of the Apostolic Signatura (1661)

Orders
- Consecration: 24 March 1686 by Paluzzo Paluzzi Altieri Degli Albertoni
- Created cardinal: 9 April 1657 by Alexander VII
- Rank: Cardinal-Bishop

Personal details
- Born: 10 May 1631 Siena
- Died: 13 September 1693 (aged 62)
- Denomination: Roman Catholic
- Coat of arms

Flavio Chigi (10 May 1631 – 13 September 1693) was an Italian Catholic Cardinal and Duke of Ariccia. He was Cardinal-Nephew to Pope Alexander VII and became a powerful political force inside the Roman Catholic Church during the latter half of the 17th century.

== Early life ==
Flavio Chigi was born 10 May 1631 in Siena, the son of Mario Chigi and Berenice della Ciaja, sister of Calanio della Ciaja, Bishop of Nardò. An other uncle was Fabio Chigi, who would become Pope Alexander VII in 1655. One of his nephews was Giovanni Bichi, whom he appointed Admiral of the Papal Navy.

He studied philosophy and law and obtained a doctorate in utroque iuris. When his uncle Fabio Chigi was made Legate to Germany, Chigi followed him there but was soon sent back to Italy to complete his studies.

In 1656, he was made Governor of Fermo and in 1658, he was made Governor of Tivoli. In the meantime, his uncle had been elected Pope in 1655 and had taken the papal throne as Pope Alexander VII. In 1657, Chigi was appointed as his Cardinal-Nephew.

== Cardinalate ==
Upon his elevation to Cardinal, Chigi was appointed Cardinal-Priest of Santa Maria del Popolo.

In 1659, at the death of Cardinal Luigi Capponi, Chigi was appointed Librarian of the Holy Roman Church and held the role for several years.

In 1664, Chigi was received by King Louis XIV of France.

Following the death of his uncle, he oversaw the creation of the tomb for Alexander VII, designed by Gianlorenzo Bernini.

== Papal conclave of 1667 ==
Pope Alexander VII died on 22 May 1667, and 64 cardinals came together for the papal conclave of 1667.

The College of Cardinals was divided into several factions. The strongest of them was the party loyal to Chigi, which grouped twenty-four of the Cardinals his uncle had created. Another influential person was Dean of the College, Francesco Barberini, who was leader of the group of old cardinals created by his uncle Pope Urban VIII. Small but important because of the possibility of using the right of exclusion were the factions of the so-called "Crown-Cardinals", of Spain and France. They represented the respective interests of Charles II of Spain and Louis XIV of France.

The French party was instructed to work for the election of cardinal Secretary of State Giulio Rospigliosi. Unlike France, Spain placed its interests in the hand of the incompetent ambassador Marquis Astorga. He allied himself with Chigi, although initially Barberini tried to obtain Spanish support for his own candidature.

Initially Chigi, supported by the Spanish party, proposed to elect cardinal Scipione d'Elci, but was not able to secure for him the required majority of two thirds. The alliance between the representatives of two major Catholic powers proved decisive and on 20 June 1667, Cardinal Giulio Rospigliosi was elected to the papacy, receiving all votes except those of his own and of Neri Corsini, who voted for Chigi.

== See also ==
- Villa Cetinale
- Lelio Colista
