= Santi Pietro e Paolo, Siena =

Church in Siena, Italy

Coordinates: 43.312634°N 11.326834°E

Chiesa dei Santi Pietro e Paolo
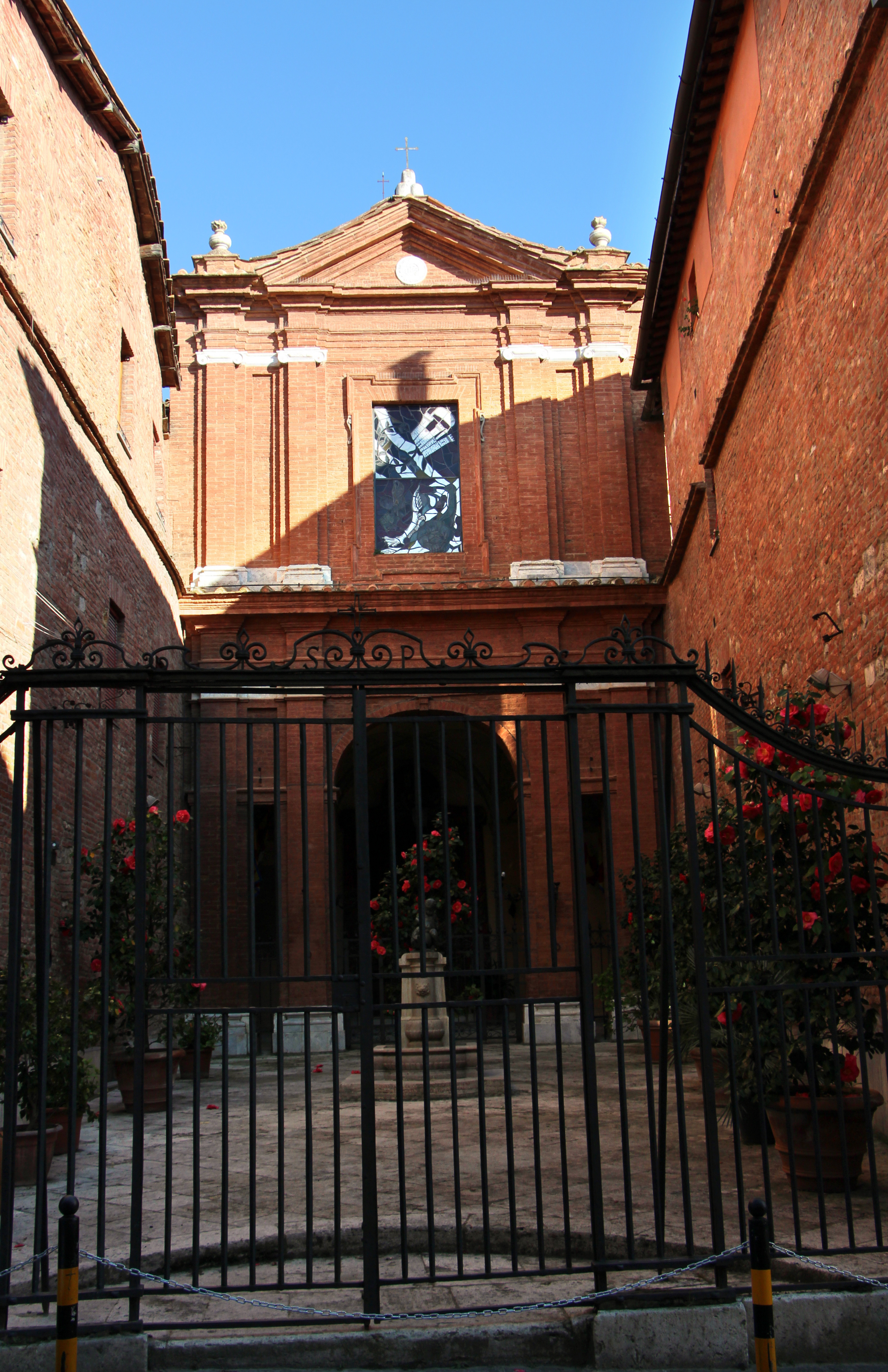

Religion
- Affiliation: Roman Catholic
- Province: Siena (province)

Location
- Location: Siena, Tuscany Italy
- Interactive map of Chiesa dei Santi Pietro e Paolo

Architecture
- Type: Church
- Style: Baroque
- Groundbreaking: 1622
- Completed: 1678 (facade) 1645 (cupola)

The church of Santi Pietro e Paolo is a Baroque style, Roman Catholic church, located on Via San Marco in the contrada of Chiocciola, in the city of Siena, region of Tuscany, Italy.

== History ==
It originally was annexed to a monastery, that moved to this site in 1361, after the plague. The original church of the monastery dedicated to San Paolo proved too small, and by the 17th-century a new church was planned. This church was begun in 1622 on designs of Flaminio del Turco; the brick façade was completed in 1678, work of Niccolò Franchini. The cupola, supported with an octagonal tambor, was completed in 1645, while the lantern was reconstructed in a Neoclassical style in 1818 by Agostino Fantastici after the earthquake of 1798 had toppled the previous lantern.

When the monastery was suppressed under Napoleonic rule, the Contrada della Chiocciola moved here the functions of the nearby Chapel della Chiocciola, which was then deconsecrated and now used as a stable for the Palio. The church was retitled and dedicated to Santi Pietro e Paolo.

The interior is ornately decorated with stucco (1711) by Giovanni Antonio Mazzuoli. Among the artworks in the interior is the main altarpiece of the Coronation of the Madonna with Saints (1520) by Andrea and Raffaello del Brescianino. There is also an altarpiece of Death of St Paul by Astolfo Petrazzi. On the altar of the Rosary is a 15th-century Madonna and Child. The crypt has a museum of Palio victories.
