= Christ Presented to the People (Il Sodoma) =

Painting by Giovanni Antonio Bazzi

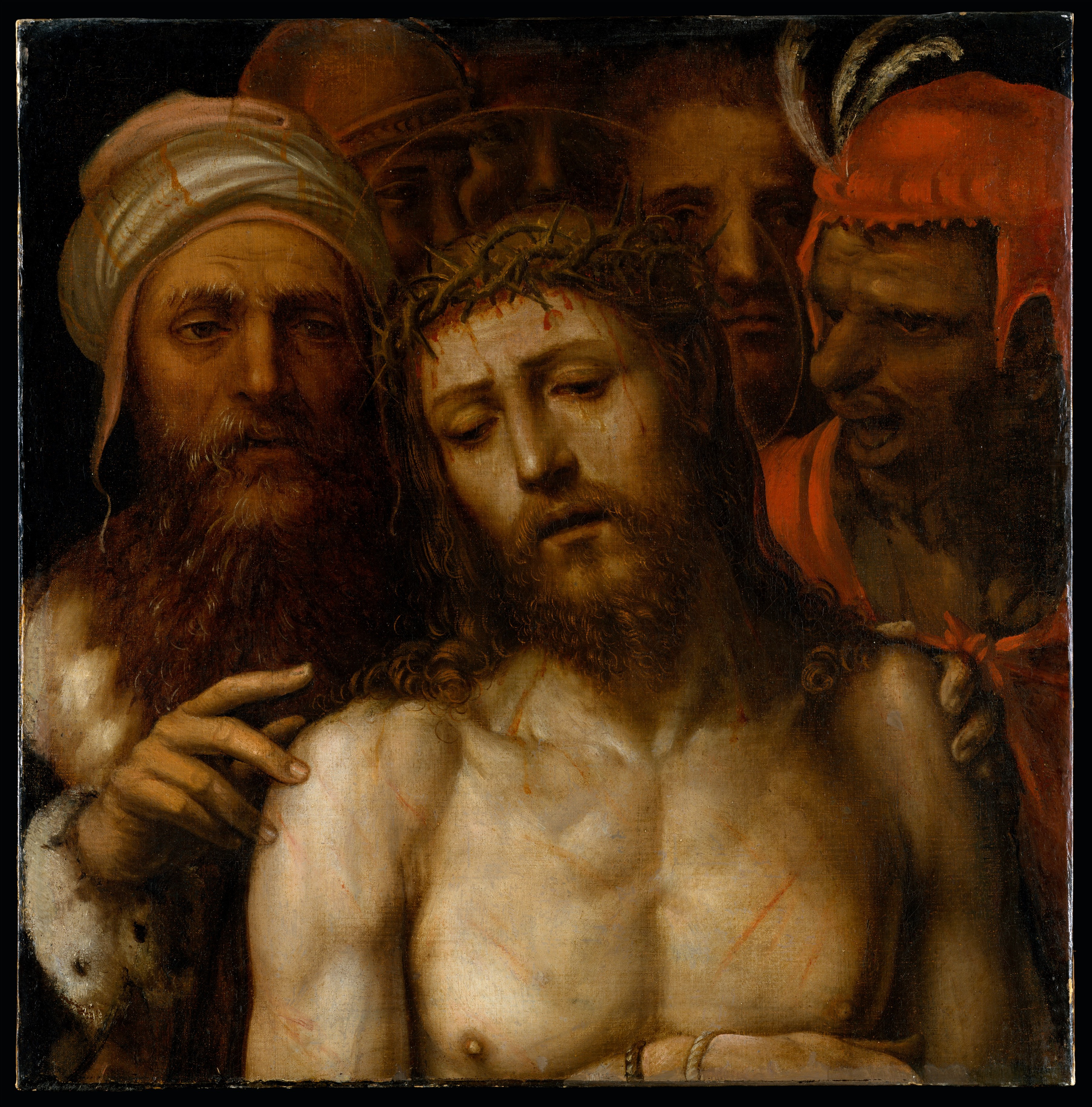
- Artist: Giovanni Antonio Bazzi (Il Sodoma)
- Year: circa 1540-49
- Medium: Oil on canvas
- Dimensions: 60 cm × 59.1 cm (24 in × 23.3 in)
- Location: Metropolitan Museum of Art, New York City

Christ Presented to the People is a mid 16th century painting by Giovanni Antonio Bazzi, an Italian artist commonly known as Il Sodoma. Done in oil on canvas, the work depicts the biblical scene in which Jesus Christ is presented to the people by Pontius Pilate with the phrase "Ecce homo" (behold the man). The painting is in the collection of the Metropolitan Museum of Art.

== Description ==
=== History ===
Originally from Vercelli, Giovanni Antoni Bazzi, commonly known as Il Sodoma, was educated in Lombardy in the art of painting. Like many other high renaissance painters, much of his work concerned Christian figures, scenes, and motifs. As a professional artist, Sodoma worked on commission for a number of clients throughout the early 16th century; some of these works were lost or incorrectly attributed to other artists.

As noted in the Metropolitan Museum of Art's profile of Sodoma's Christ Presented to the People, the work was not identified as being Sodoma's until the mid 19th century. The Met and other scholars have attributed the work to between 1540 and 1549, making the painting one of Sodoma's late works. The work is comparable in some areas (subject material, composition) to an early work (dated to 1525) by Sodoma depicting Christ being tormented by Pontius Pilate's soldiers, though the works do differ in some respects.

Christ Presented to the People's frame is itself historical, having been made in Sienna in 1540. The frame contains some gilding that may have been added in the 19th century.

=== Painting ===
The painting itself depicts a bound, crowned, bleeding Christ (center) being presented to the people by Pontius Pilate (left from center). The painting captures the moment in which Pilate announces to the crowd "Ecce homo" (behold the man), a line in keeping with biblical text in the gospel of John 19:5. Pilate (a Roman governor) himself is depicted wearing Middle Eastern clothing in place of Roman garb, and is described by one source as having "vaguely orientalizing costume"; such depictions possibly are in reference to the-then expanding Ottoman Empire, a major geopolitical force that often clashed with Christian nations in Europe. To Christ's right is a black African, a possible reference to the Arab slave trade (which resulted in black slaves being present in the Middle East) and the Muslim domination of Africa. Several scholars have also noted that, as the scene depicted in Christ takes place hours before Christ's execution, the presence of a black African is a likely continuation of the European tradition of associating black Africans with executioners.
