= Sant'Agostino, Siena =

Roman Catholic church in Siena, Tuscany, Italy

Coordinates: 43°18′52″N 11°19′53″E

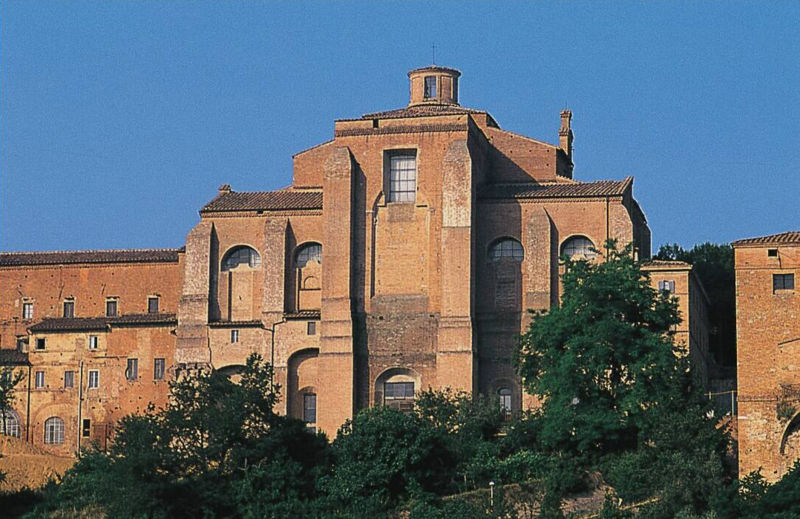
The church of Sant'Agostino.

Sant'Agostino is a Roman Catholic church in Siena, region of Tuscany, Italy.

== History ==
The construction of the church and its associated convent began in 1258 and lasted for more than fifty years. Other renovations and reconstructions were carried out in the following centuries. The church had a major fire in 1747. Luigi Vanvitelli directed the restoration works, from 1747 to 1755, where the interior was redesigned and he maintained the large altars in polychrome marble from the 16th and 17th centuries. The stucco statues in the nave and in the transept date from the Vanvitelli renovation. The portico was constructed in the early 19th century by Agostino Fantastici.

== Art ==
The church is home to a large number of artworks, including:

- Baptism of Constantine by Francesco Vanni
- Trinity and Saints altarpiece by Pietro Sorri
- Funerary monument of Agostino Chigi (1631)
- Birth of the Virgin and Nativity in chapel on Right by Francesco di Giorgio Martini and his workshop
- Path to the Calvary by Ventura Salimbeni
- The Temptation of St Anthony by Rutilio Manetti
- Bichi Chapel
  - Frescoes by Luca Signorelli
  - Statue of Saint Christopher by Francesco di Giorgio
  - Altarpiece of San Cristoforo by Niccolo Franchini
- Cappella Piccolomini
  - Enthroned Madonna with child and saints by Ambrogio Lorenzetti
  - Piccolomini altar in polychrome marble (1596), which houses an Adoration of the Magi by Il Sodoma and a Crucifixion by Perugino
  - Funerary monument to Pope Pius II (1850)

The church was adjacent to the Collegio Tolomei, Siena with neoclassical portico by Agostino Fantastici.
