= Collegio Tolomei, Siena =

Italian high school

The Collegio Tolomei is a high school adjacent to Sant'Agostino and Piazza dell'Erbe in Siena, region of Tuscany, Italy.

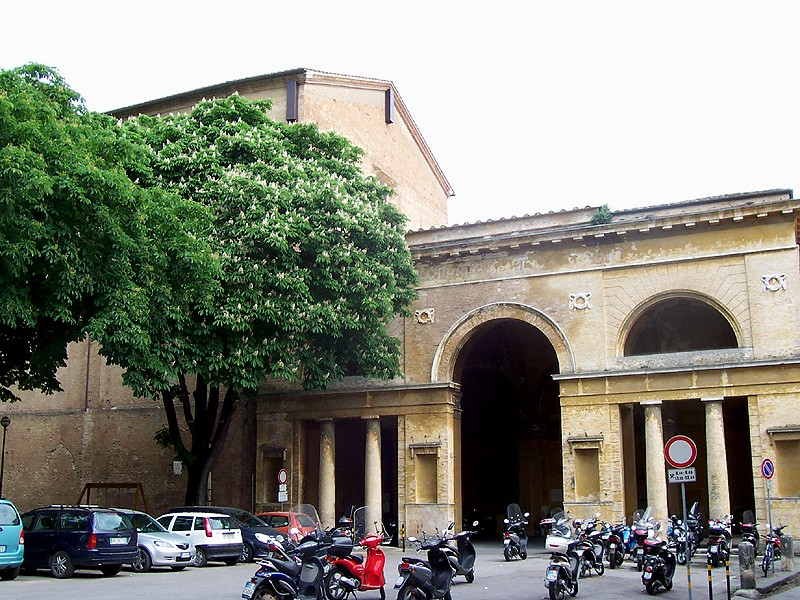
Chiesa di S. Agostino and Collegio Tolomei (right side)

== History ==
It was founded in 1676 with an endowment by Celso Tolomei, of a prominent and ancient Sienese family. The school was then run as a seminary by the Jesuits and targeted youth from the noble families in Siena. With the 1773 suppression of the Jesuit order, the institution passed on to the Scolopi order. After the convulsive period of French occupation, including some moves within the town, in 1820 the school reverted to the Scolopi, who ran the school till 1876. The school was in 1882 transformed into a Convitto Nazionale (National elementary-middle school) under the lay leadership. In 1886–1888, it became a military college under control of the Ministry of War. In 1893, it was returned to the jurisdiction of the Ministry of Public Education under the name of Convitto Nazionale, which it still conserves.

The portico and entrance staircase were designed by Agostino Fantastici in the 19th century.
