= Montalcino Cathedral =

Cathedral in Montalcino, Italy

Coordinates: 43°03′32″N 11°29′16″E

Montalcino Cathedral (Italian: Duomo di Montalcino, Concattedrale di San Salvatore) is a Roman Catholic cathedral in Montalcino in the province of Siena, Italy. Formerly the seat of the bishops of Montalcino, since 1986 it has been a co-cathedral in the Archdiocese of Siena-Colle di Val d'Elsa-Montalcino. It is dedicated to the Holy Saviour (San Salvatore).

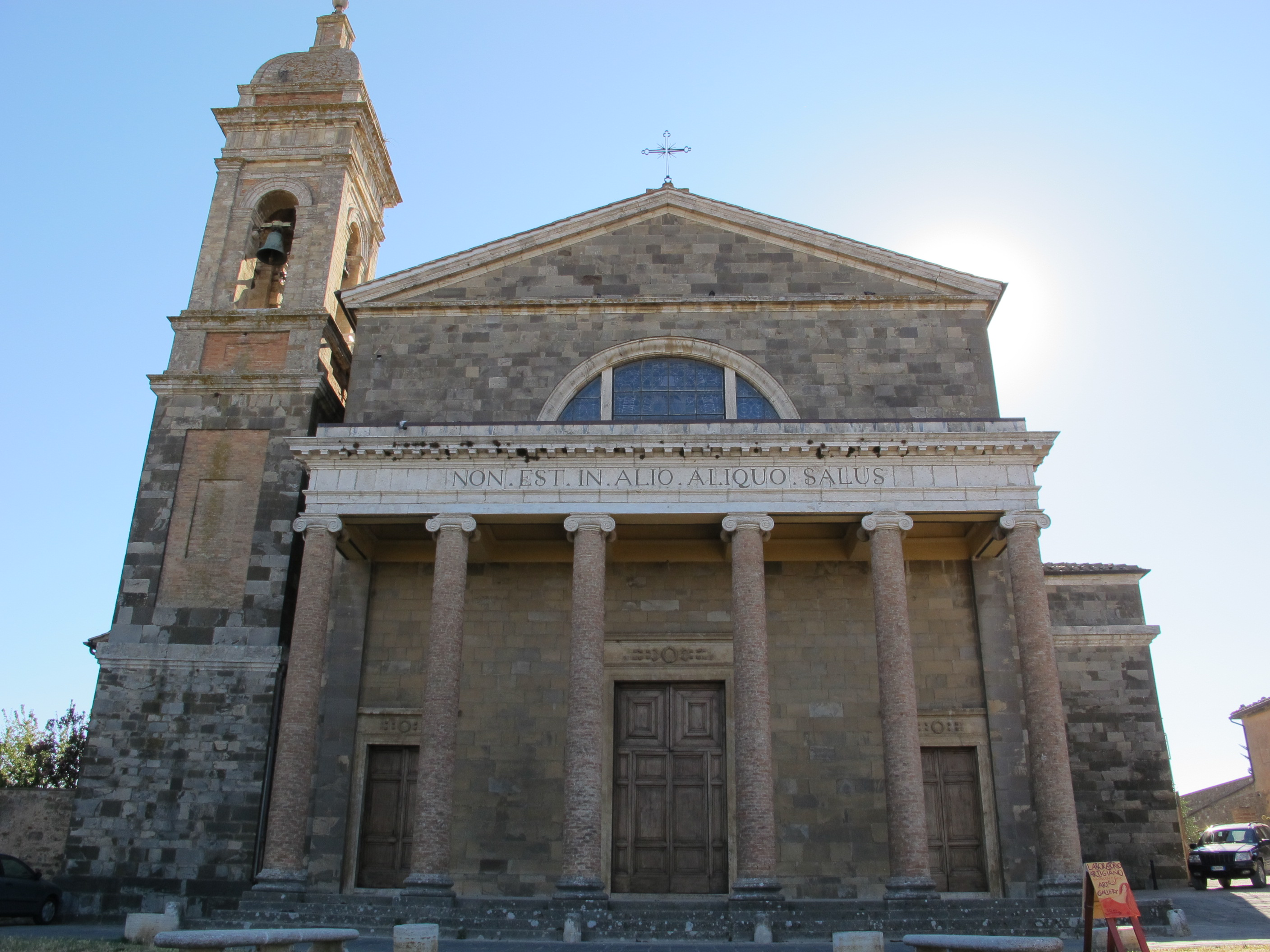
Facade of Duomo of Montalcino

== History ==
The church that was to become the cathedral was constructed in the 14th century on the site of the ancient pieve of San Salvatore, believed to have been built around the year 1000, and was elevated to the status of cathedral in 1462 by Pope Pius II.

It was demolished and rebuilt between 1818 and 1832 in the Neo-Classical style to plans by the Sienese architect Agostino Fantastici.

The architecture is characterized by a pronaos, or porch, consisting of six Ionic columns and entablature. Three portals in the east front indicate the division of the building into three naves, which have barrel vaults.

The bell tower dates from the eighteenth century. The materials for its construction were taken from the Romanesque church of San Pietro in Asso.

The high altar is made from a number of different materials. Fantastici's design for it from 1828 survives, from which it appears that it was somewhat simplified in its execution.

== Works of art ==
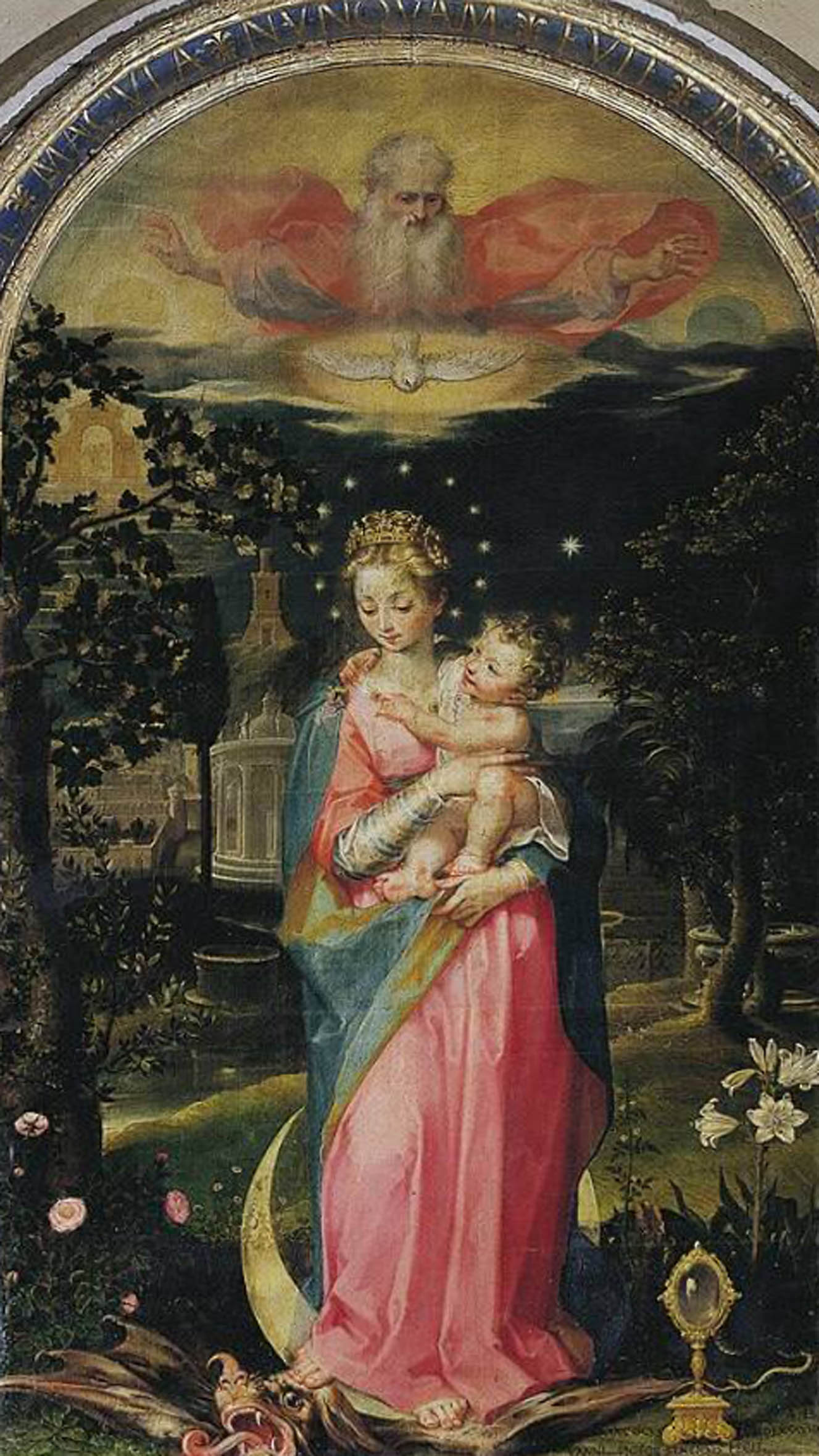
Francesco Vanni, Immaculate Conception with Jesus and God the Father (1588)

Among the notable works of art in the cathedral is the painting Immaculate Conception with Jesus and God the Father by a young Francesco Vanni of Siena, showing a strong link to the painting of the same subject by Federico Barocci. On the front altar, is a painting of Saint John the Baptist in the desert, another early work by Francesco Vanni.

On the altar in the Chapel of Suffering is a painting of the Sienese school of the last quarter of the 16th century, derived from Beccafumi, of Saint Michael the Archangel driving the rebellious angels from Paradise.

In the first chapel of the northern nave some fragments have been reassembled of a travertine sculpture depicting Christ in a mandorla almond between two angels with thuribles, from the second half of the 11th century, which originally formed part of the portal of the ancient pieve which survived until 1817, when it was demolished.

On the back wall of the sacristy is a painting of 1647 by Francesco Nasini of The Assumption of the Virgin with angels and with Saints Hippolytus and Cyprian which was commissioned by Ippolito Senesi for an altar of Saints Hippolytus and Anthony, since demolished.

== Bibliography ==
- Santi, Bruno (ed.), 1999: L'Amiata e la Val d'Orcia, in the series "I Luoghi della Fede", Milano, Mondadori, 1999, pp. 59 – 60. ISBN 88-04-46780-0
