= Colle di Val d'Elsa Cathedral =

Roman Catholic cathedral in Tuscany, Italy

Coordinates: 43°25′21.14″N 11°07′13.40″E

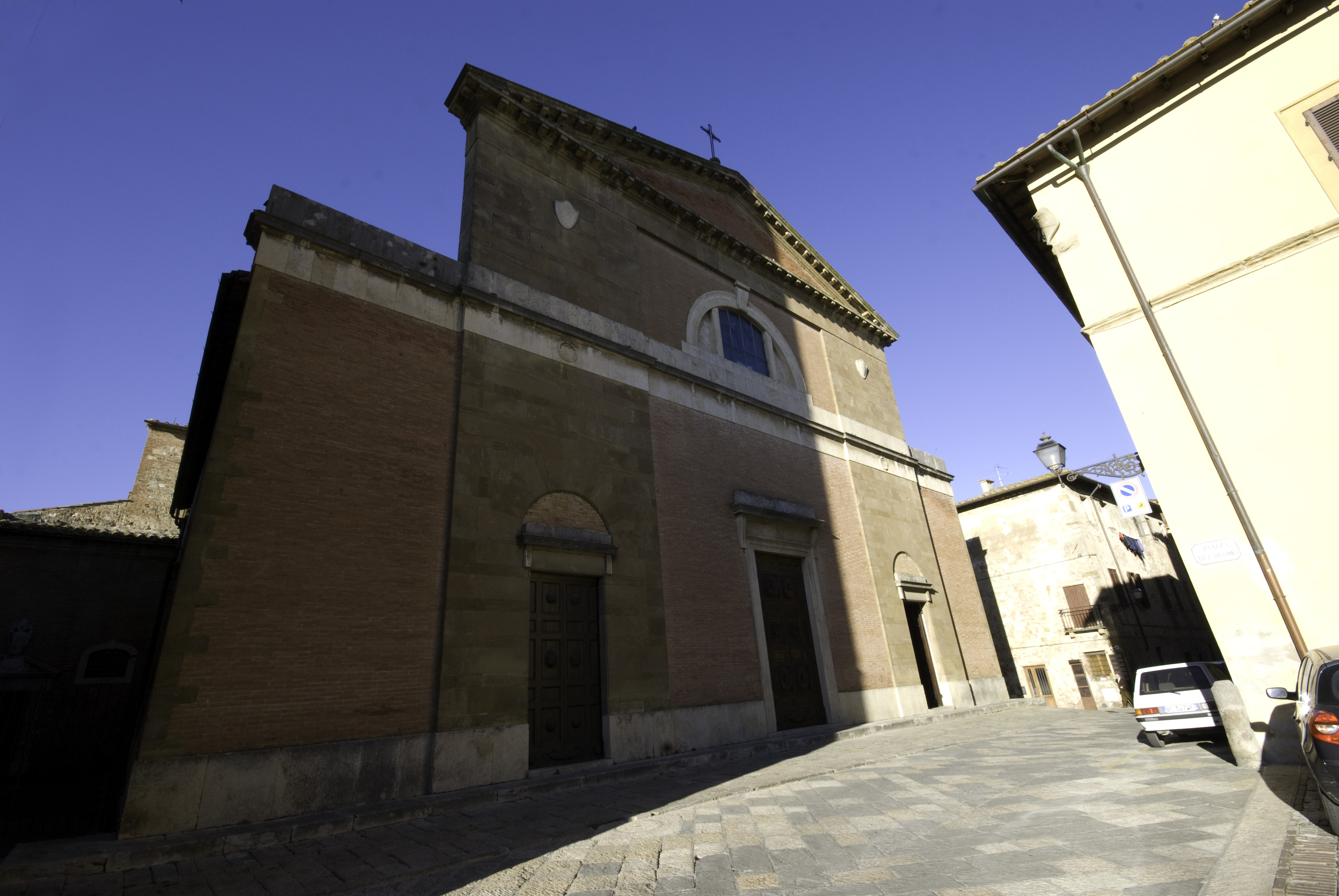
View of the façade

Colle di Val d'Elsa Cathedral (Italian: Duomo di Colle di Val d'Elsa; Concattedrale dei Santi Alberto e Marziale) is a Roman Catholic cathedral in Colle di Val d'Elsa, Tuscany, Italy. Anciently a pieve of the Holy Saviour (San Salvatore), it is now dedicated to Saints Albert and Martial. Formerly the episcopal seat of the Diocese of Colle di Val d'Elsa from its creation in 1592, it is now a co-cathedral of the Archdiocese of Siena-Colle di Val d'Elsa-Montalcino.

== History ==
Construction started in 1603 on the site of the old parish church of San Salvatore, expanded during the 11th century by Pisan workers.

Usimbardo Usimbardi, the first bishop of the new Diocese of Colle di Val d'Elsa created in 1592, entrusted the design of the new cathedral to the architect Fausto Rughesi.

The building has a Greek cross plan with a nave and two aisles, divided into four bays by rectangular piers. The transept is closed by two large side-chapels.

The presbytery is dominated by a cupola. The nave and the arms of the transept are roofed by barrel vaults, and the aisles by cross vaults. The eight side-chapels have barrel vaults.

The sober Neo-Classical façade is by Agostino Fantastici (1782–1845). Mostly in brick, it is interrupted by two raised areas in sandstone containing the side portals, under cornices of travertine, running along the frontage at the level of the base of the second storey. The tympanum has an indented triangular frame.

The second bishop, Cosimo Gherardesca, gave the new building the necessary furniture to equip it for worship. The choir stalls are still the originals, made in 1628 by Silvestro Ceramelli.

A tabernacle by Mino da Fiesole houses one of the alleged nails used for the Crucifixion.

== Sources ==
- Il Chianti e la Valdelsa senese, Milan, Mondadori, 1999, pp. 62 – 67. ISBN 88-04-46794-0
