= Albert of Chiatina =

Roman Catholic Saint

Saint Albert of Chiatina
- Born: 1135; Chiatina, Val d’Arbia, Italy
- Died: 1202
- Venerated in: Roman Catholic Church
- Feast: August 17
- Patronage: Colle Val d'Elsa

Saint Albert of Chiatina (1135–1202) is venerated as a saint by the Catholic Church. He was archpriest of Colle di Val d'Elsa, and Colle di Val d'Elsa Cathedral is dedicated to him.

== Sources ==
- Anna Benvenuti (a cura di), "Sant'Alberto di Colle. Studi e documenti"; Ed. Mandragora, Firenze 2005.
