= Villa il Pavone =

Neo-Renaissance style suburban palace in Tuscany, Italy

The Villa il Pavone is a neo-Renaissance style suburban palace located outside of the city of Siena, a region of Tuscany, Italy.

== History ==
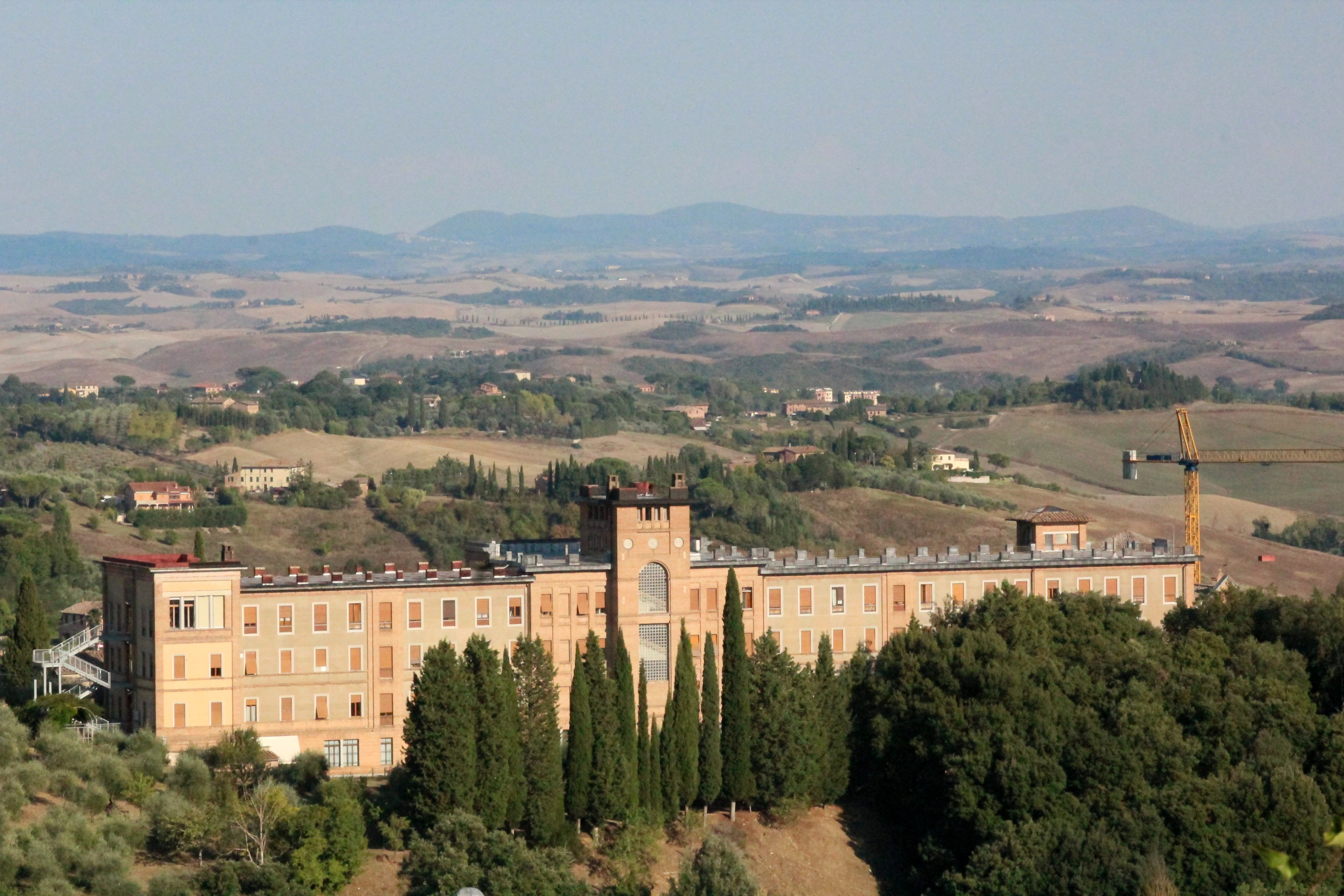
Villa Il Pavone

In 1825, Mario Bianchi Bandinelli commissioned the Sienese architect Agostino Fantastici to refurbish the existing Palazzo del Pavone, attributed to Francesco di Giorgio, into a villa with gardens. The entry gate has two pillars topped by sphinxes, sculpted by Luigi Magi.

The small square villa building is accessed by a portico with Tuscan-style columns. Along the sides of the villa are brick orangeries. The freer-style Romantic garden is bordered by woods to the west and is crossed by winding paths. It also has designed set-pieces: a Doric loggia overlooking the Via Cassia, a monument recalling Roman pyramid sepulchres (e.g. Pyramid of Cestius) and a hypogeum-grotto, overlooking a small pond.

In 2015, the villa served as a retirement home.
