= Buronzo Altarpiece =

1514 painting by Gerolamo Giovenone

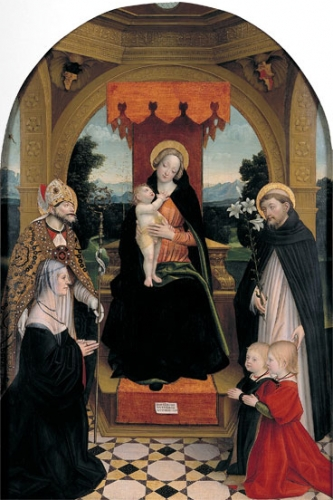
The Buronzo Altarpiece

The Buronzo Altarpiece is a 1514 tempera on panel painting by Gerolamo Giovenone, now in the Galleria Sabauda in Turin, to which it was given in 1836, only a few years after the gallery opened. It shows the Madonna and Child with Saints Abundius and Dominic presenting the work's commissioner Ludovica Buronzo and her sons Pietro and Gerolamo. It is signed and dated by the artist on a small scroll on the base of the throne. It was produced for the Sant'Abbondio chapel in San Paolo church in Vercelli, later passing onto the art market.
