= Chigi Altarpiece =

Painting by Pietro Perugino

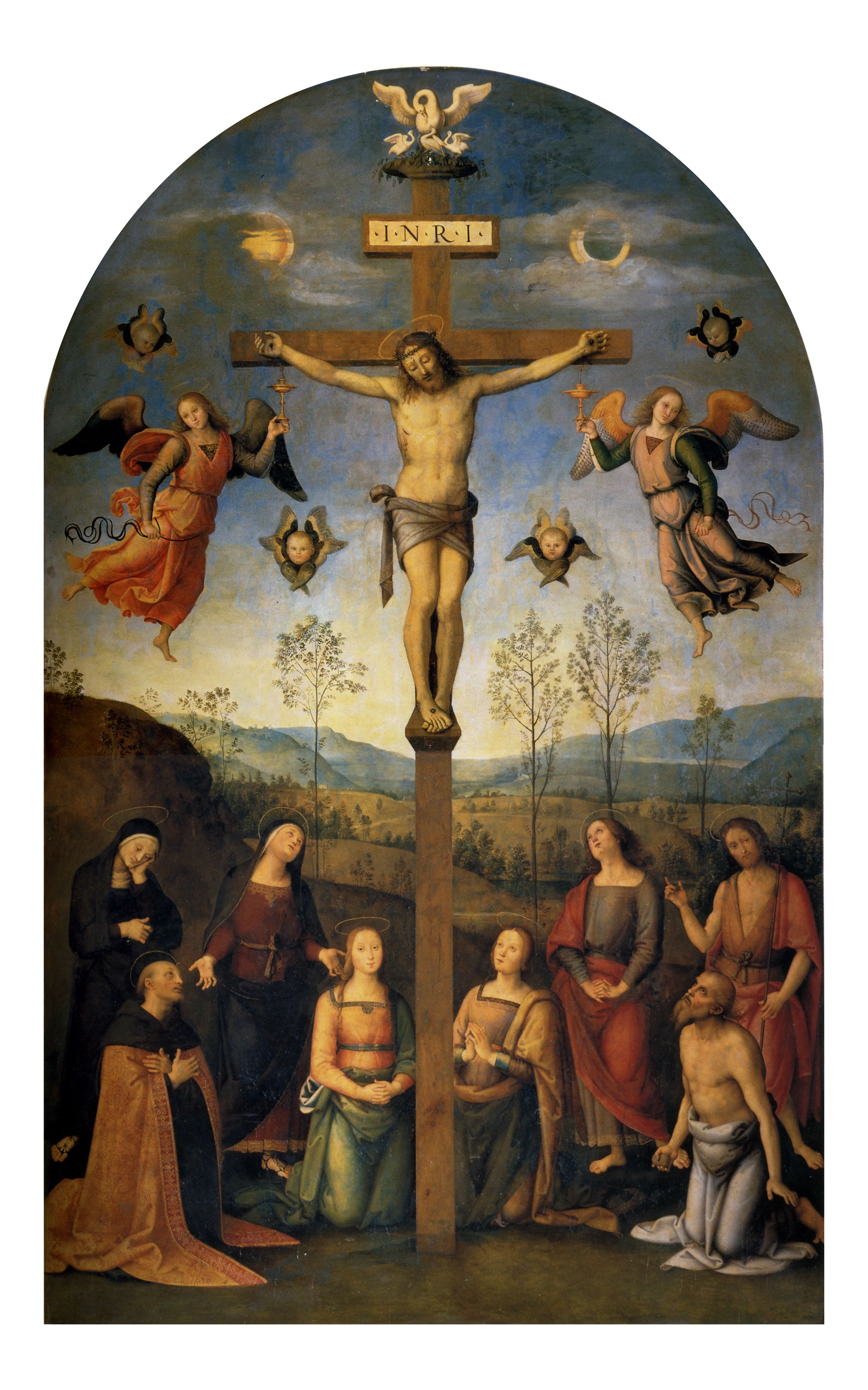
- Artist: Perugino
- Year: 1506–1507
- Medium: oil on panel
- Dimensions: 400 cm × 289 cm (160 in × 114 in)
- Location: Sant'Agostino, Sienna

The Chigi Altarpiece is an altarpiece by Perugino, dating to around 1506–1507. It is named after its commissioner Agostino Chigi, a Sienese banker, for the Chigi family chapel in the church of Sant'Agostino in Siena, where it still hangs.

Like most altarpieces by Perugino, it has two registers. The upper heavenly one shows Christ on the cross surrounded by a symmetrical arrangement of angels and cherubim. The lower earthly register shows eight lamenting saints connected to the commissioner, the church and the chapel - on the right are John the Baptist and Jerome, for example. The deep landscape backgrounds shows hills and a clear sky. The work originally also had a predella, which is now divided between the Metropolitan Museum of Art in New York and the Art Institute of Chicago.
