= Archdiocese of Siena–Colle di Val d'Elsa–Montalcino =

Roman Catholic archdiocese in Italy

Coordinates: 43.3186°N 11.3306°E

Archdiocese of Siena-Colle di Val d'Elsa-Montalcino Archidioecesis Senensis-Collensis-Ilcinensis

Catholic
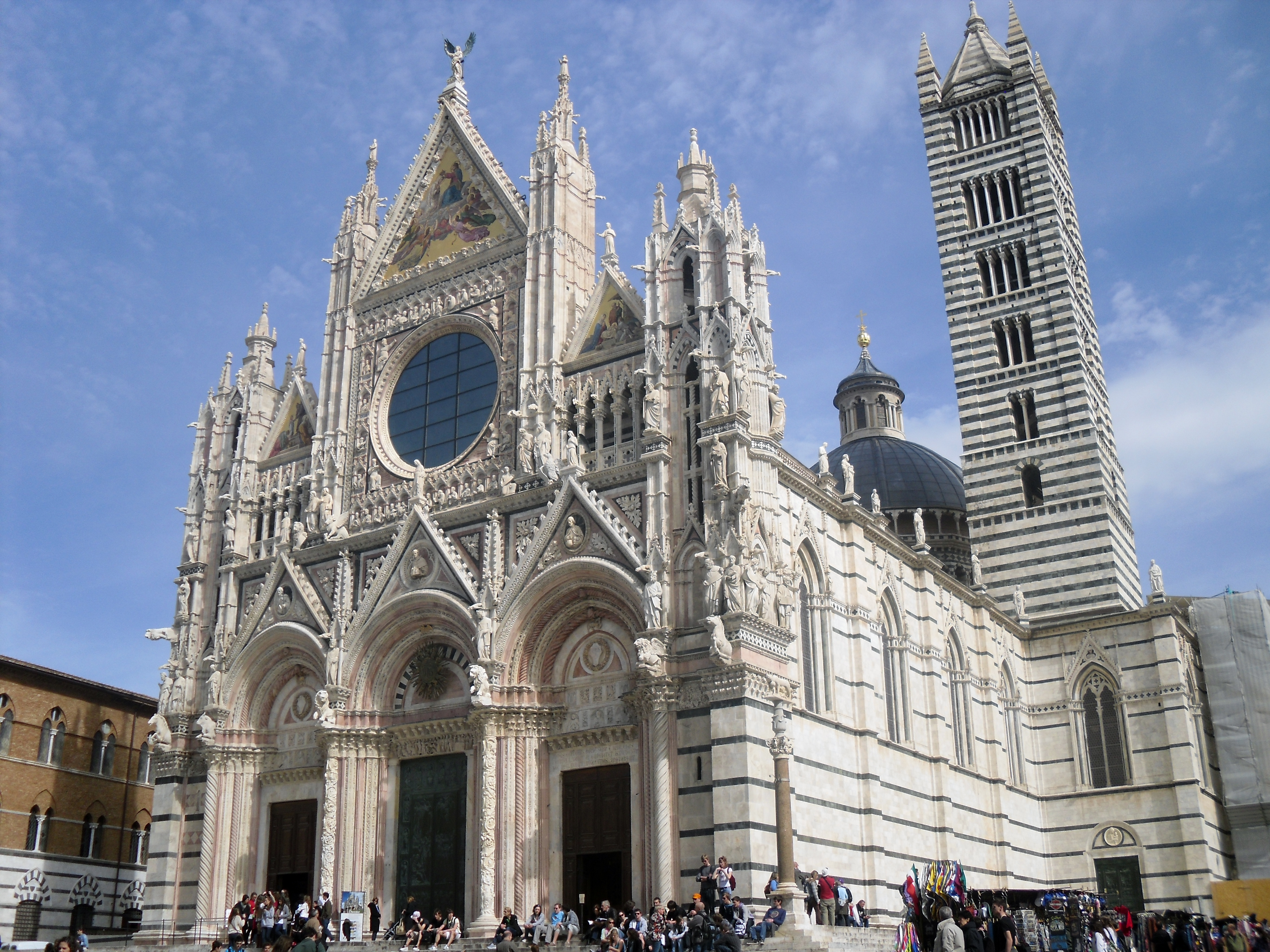
- Siena Cathedral

Location
- Country: Italy
- Ecclesiastical province: Siena-Colle di Val d'Elsa-Montalcino

Statistics
- Area: 2,265 km^{2} (875 sq mi)
- Population: Total; Catholics: (as of 2020); 197,180; 177,460 (90%)
- Parishes: 139

Information
- Denomination: Catholic Church
- Rite: Roman Rite
- Established: 4th century
- Cathedral: Cattedrale di S. Maria Assunta (Siena)
- Co-cathedral: Concattedrale di Ss. Marziale e Alberto (Colle di Val d'Elsa); Concattedrale di S. Salvatore (Montalcino)
- Secular priests: 73 (diocesan); 39 (Religious Orders); 9 Permanent Deacons

Current leadership
- Pope: Leo XIV
- Archbishop: Augusto Paolo Lojudice
- Bishops emeritus: Antonio Buoncristiani; Gaetano Bonicelli

Map

Website
- www.arcidiocesi.siena.it

The Archdiocese of Siena-Colle di Val d'Elsa-Montalcino (Latin: Archidioecesis Senensis-Collensis-Ilcinensis) is a Latin Church archdiocese of the Catholic Church in Tuscany. The seat of the archbishop is the Cathedral of the Assumption in Siena. Until 1459, the diocese was immediately subject to the Holy See (Papacy), and its bishops attended the Roman synods. In 1459, Pope Pius II made Siena a metropolitan archbishopric.

== History ==
From September 1407 to January 1408, Siena played host to the papal Court of Pope Gregory XII of the Roman Obedience.

In 1423, Siena was host to what was announced as a general council of the Church. Such meetings had been mandated by the Council of Constance, and, though Pope Martin V was most reluctant to have another council like Pisa or Constance, he authorized the assembly to meet in Pavia in the Spring of 1423. On 22 June, however, alleging the presence of the pestilence in Pavia, the Pope transferred the council to Siena. On 21 July 1423 the Council reopened in Siena, though there was only one general session, on 8 November. Work continued until the papal legates dissolved the council on 26 February 1424, though the papal bull of dissolution was not published until 12 March.

When Enea Silvio Bartolomeo Piccolomini, who was born near the town and served as bishop of Siena since 1450, got elected as Pope Pius II in 1458, he soon issued the bull "Triumphans Pastor" (22 April 1459), in which he raised the diocese of Siena to metropolitan status, and assigned to it as suffragans the dioceses of Soano, Chiusi, Massa, and Grosseto.

=== Consolidation ===
The Second Vatican Council, in order to ensure that all Catholics received proper spiritual attention, decreed the reorganization of the diocesan structure of Italy and the consolidation of small and struggling dioceses.

In 1980, the diocese of Montalcino claimed a Catholic population of 24,500 persons. Colle di Val d'Elsa had slightly over 60,000.

On 18 February 1984, the Vatican and the Italian State signed a new and revised concordat. Based on the revisions, a set of Normae was issued on 15 November 1984, which was accompanied in the next year, on 3 June 1985, by enabling legislation. According to the agreement, the practice of having one bishop govern two separate dioceses at the same time, aeque personaliter, was abolished. This made the combining of Montalcino and Colle di Val d'Elsa under one bishop infeasible. Instead, the Vatican continued consultations which had begun under Pope John XXIII for the merging of small dioceses, especially those with personnel and financial problems, into one combined diocese. On 30 September 1986, Pope John Paul II ordered that the dioceses of Montalcino and Colle be merged with the diocese of Siena, into one diocese with one bishop, with the Latin title Archidioecesis Senensis-Collensis-Ilcinensis. The seat of the diocese was to be in Siena, and the cathedral of Siena was to serve as the cathedral of the merged dioceses. The cathedrals in Montalcino and Colle were to become co-cathedrals, and the cathedral Chapters were to be a Capitulum Concathedralis. There was to be only one diocesan Tribunal, in Siena, and likewise one seminary, one College of Consultors, and one Priests' Council. The territory of the new diocese was to include the territory of the former dioceses of Montalcino and of Colle.

=== Synods ===
A provincial synod was an irregularly summoned meeting of the Metropolitan Archbishop of an ecclesiastical province with his suffragan bishops and other prelates, for the purpose of legislating for and reforming the collection of dioceses which belonged to the synod. A diocesan synod was an irregularly held, but important, meeting of the bishop of a diocese and his clergy. Its purpose was (1) to proclaim generally the various decrees already issued by the bishop; (2) to discuss and ratify measures on which the bishop chose to consult with his clergy; (3) to publish statutes and decrees of the diocesan synod, of the provincial synod, and of the Holy See.

Cardinal Francesco Maria Tarugi (1597–1607), Archbishop of Siena, presided over a provincial synod in Siena in 1599, and published the decrees of the assembly.

Archbishop Giuseppe Mancini (1824–1855) held a provincial synod in Siena from 30 June to 7 July 1850. The sessions were attended by four suffragan bishops (Massa e Populonia, Sovana e Pitigliano, Grosseto, and Chiusi e Pienza) as well as two bishops directly dependent upon the Holy See (Arezzo, Montepulciano). The decrees of the synod were published.

== Bishops and archbishops of Siena ==
=== to 1000 ===
- [Lucifer of Siena (c. 306)]
- [Florianus (313–335)]
- [Dodo (440)]
- Eusebius (attested 465)
- [Magnus (520)]
- [Maurus (565)]
- [Aymo (597)]
- [Robertus (612)]
- [Piriteus (628)]
- [Antifredus (642)]
- Maurus (attested 649)
- [Andreas (658)]
- [Gualteranus (670)]
- [Gerardus (674)]
- Vitellianus (attested 679)
- [Lupus (689–?)]
- [Causivius (722)]
- Adeodatus (attested 715, 730)
- Grossus (attested 743)
- Jordanus (attested 761)
- Peredeus (776)
- [Joannes (792)]
- [Gherardus (?)]
- Andrea (attested 795, 801)
- [Piriteus (800)]
- Perteus (Petrus) (826)
- [Tommaso (830)]
- Anastasius (attested 833)
- [Gerardus (841)]
- Concio (Cantius) (844–853)
- [Gherardo (855)]
- [Ambrosius (864)]
- [Ansifredo (uncertain)]
- [Ubertino (900)]
- [Egidio (906)]
- Theoderigus (attested 913 or 915)
- Gerardus (attested 946)
- [Vitalianus]
- [Pisanus (963)]
- [Lucidus]
- Ildebrandus (attested 1000, 1018)

=== 1000 to 1458 ===
- Adeodato (1001)
- Giselbertus (attested 1012)
- Leo (attested 1027, 1030)
- [Adalbertus (attested 1036)]
- Joannes (1037–1063)
- Antifredo (1058)
- [Roffredus ? (1059)]
- Amadio (1062)
- Adelbertus (attested 1068)
- Rodulfus (attested 1073–1084)
- Gualfredus (attested 1108–1127)
- Ranierius (1127–1170)
- Gunteramus (1170–1188)
- Bonus (1189–1215)
- Bonfilius (1216–1252)
- Tommaso Fusconi (1253–1273)
- Bernardo (1273–1281)
- Rainaldo di Uguccione Malavolti (1282–1307)
- Ruggeri, O. P. (1307–1316)
- Donusdei dei Malavolti (1317–1350)
- Azzolino dei Malavolti (1351–1370)
- Iacopo di Egidio dei Malavolti (1370–1371)
- Guglielmo Vasco, O.Min.Conv. (1371–1377)
- Luca Bettini (1377–1384)
- [Michele Pelagalli, O.P. (1384)]
- Carlo Minutoli (1384–1385 resigned)
- Francesco Mormigli (1385–1396 resigned)
- Guglielmo, (1396–1407)
- Gabriele Condulmer, C.R. (1407–1409 resigned)
- Antonio Casini (1409–1427 resigned)
- Carlo Bartoli (1427–1446)
- Cristoforo di San Marcello (1444)
- Neri da Montecarlo (1444–1450)
- Enea Silvio Piccolomini (23 September 1450 – August 19, 1458).
- Antonio Piccolomini, O.S.B. (1458–1459)

=== Archbishops of Siena ===
- Francesco Piccolomini (1460–1503)
- Giovanni Piccolomini (1503 – 7 April 1529 resigned)
- Francesco Bandini Piccolomini (1529–1588)
- Ascanio I Piccolomini (1588–1597)
- Francesco Maria Tarugi (1597–1607 resigned)
- Camillo Borghese (1607–1612)
- Metello Bichi (17 December 1612 – 23 March 1615 resigned)
- Alessandro Petrucci (1615–1628)
- Ascanio Piccolomini (1629 – 14 September 1671)
- Celio Piccolomini (18 March 1671 – 24 May 1681)
- Leonardo Marsili (1682 – 8 April 1713)
- Alessandro Zondadari (20 January 1715 – 4 January 1744)
- Alessandro Cervini (1747–1771)
- Tiberio Borghesi (1772–1792)
- Alfonso Marsili (1792–1794)
- Antonio Felice Zondadari (1795–1823)
- Giuseppe Mancini (1824–1855)
- Ferdinando Baldanzi (1855–1866)
- Vacant (1866–1871)
- Enrico Bindi (27 October 1871 – 1876)
- Giovanni Pierallini (29 September 1876 – 1888)
- Celestino Zini (1889 – 19 May 1892)
- Benedetto Tommasi (11 June 1892 – 1908)
- Prospero Scaccia (5 June 1909 – 29 September 1932)
- Gustavo Matteoni (29 September 1932 – 17 November 1934)
- Mario Toccabelli (1 April 1935 – 14 April 1961)

=== Archbishops of Siena-Colle di Val d'Elsa-Montalcino ===
On 30 September 1986 the archdiocese was united with the Diocese of Colle di Val d'Elsa and the Diocese of Montalcino, and named in Latin Senensis-Collensis-Ilcinensis.

- Mario Jsmaele Castellano, O.P. (6 June 1961 – 14 November 1989 retired)
- Gaetano Bonicelli (14 November 1989 – 23 May 2001 retired)
- Antonio Buoncristiani (23 May 2001 – 6 May 2019 retired)
- Augusto Paolo Lojudice (6 May 2019 – present)

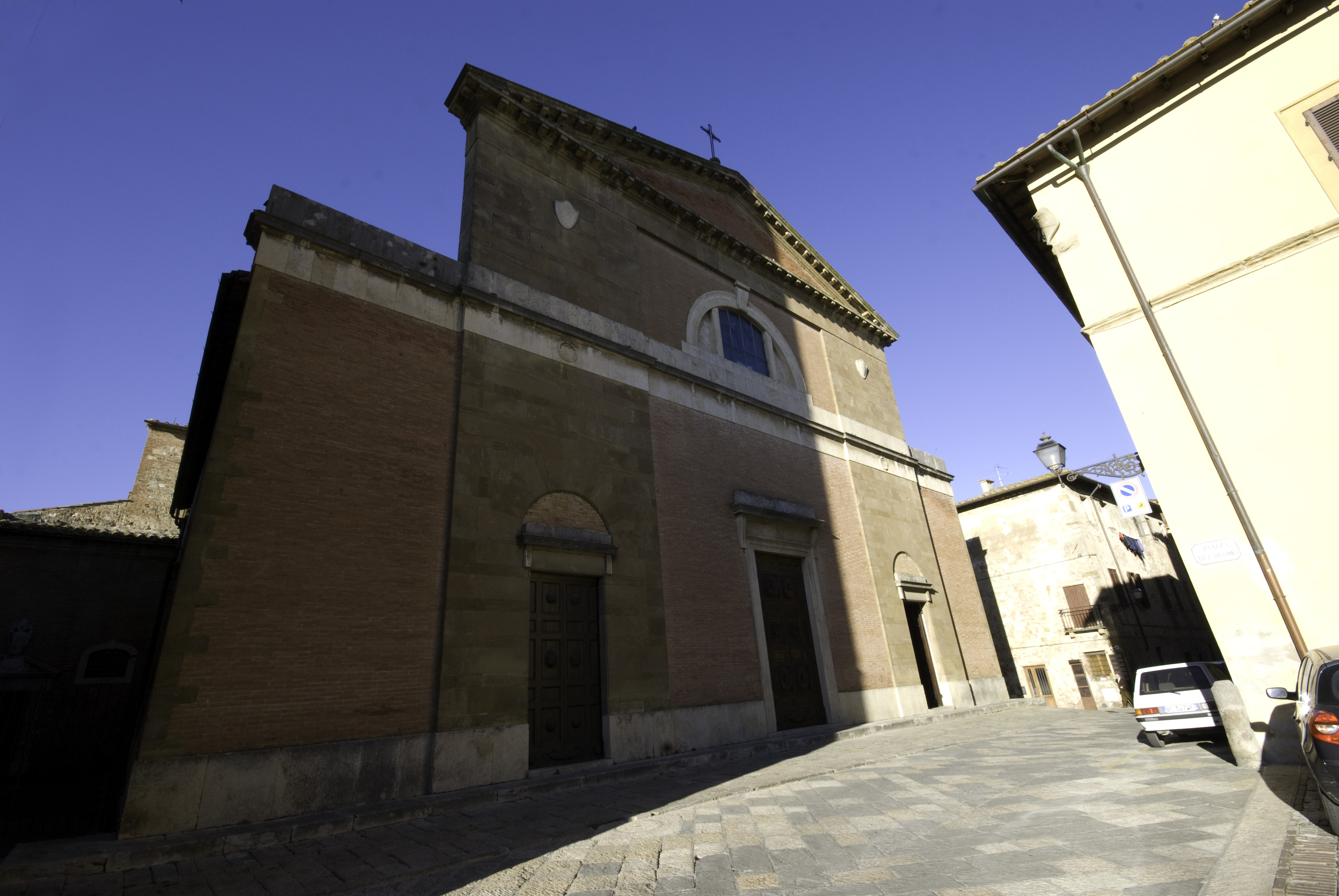
Co-cathedral of Colle di Val d'Elsa

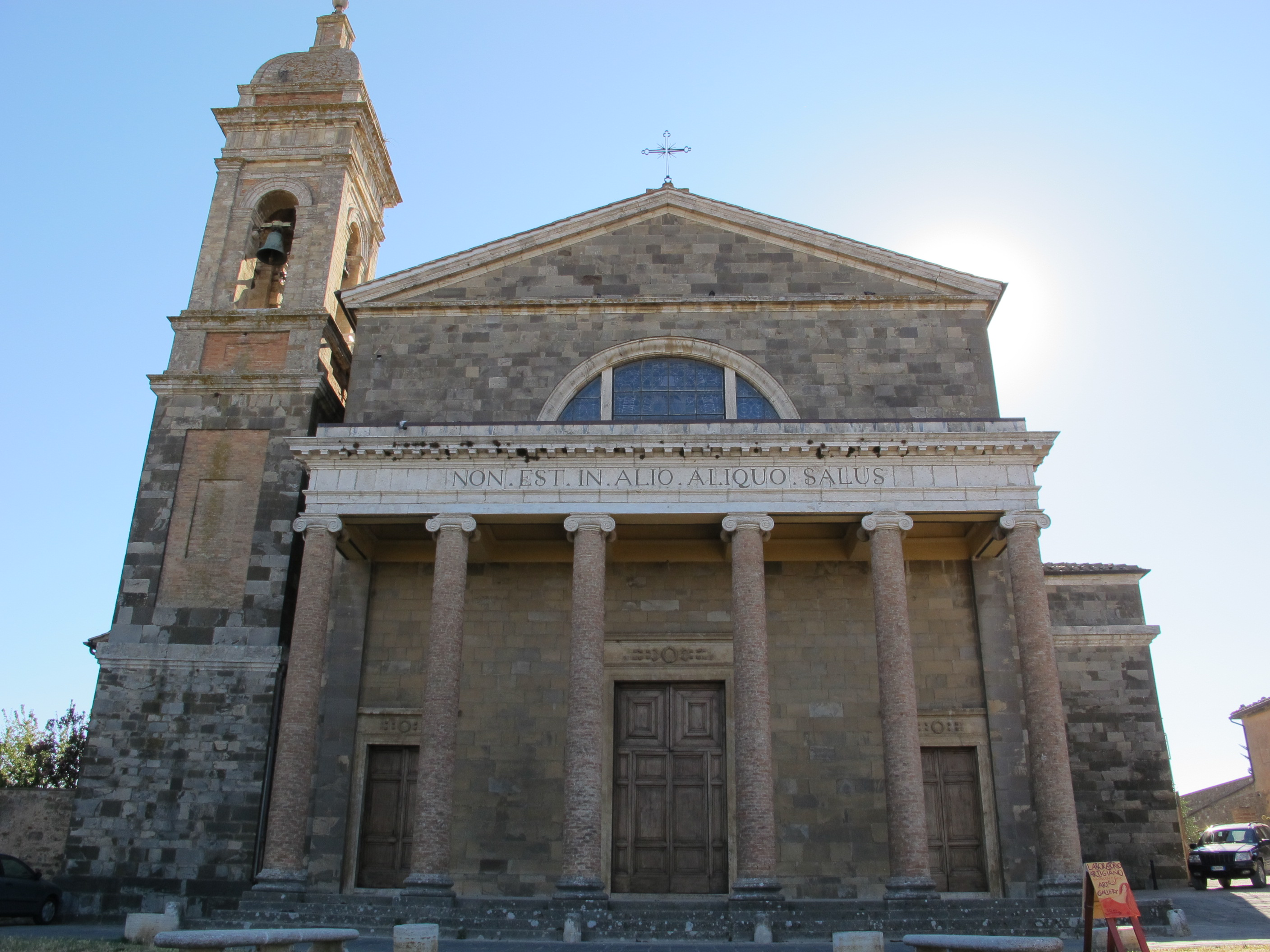
Co-cathedral in Montalcino

== See also ==
- Roman Catholic Diocese of Colle di Val d'Elsa
- Roman Catholic Diocese of Montalcino
- List of Catholic dioceses in Italy

== Books ==
- Gams, Pius Bonifatius (1873). Series episcoporum Ecclesiae catholicae: quotquot innotuerunt a beato Petro apostolo. Ratisbon: Typis et Sumptibus Georgii Josephi Manz. pp. 753–754. (Use with caution; obsolete)
- Eubel, Conradus, ed. (1913). Hierarchia catholica (in Latin). Vol. Tomus 1 (second ed.). Münster: Libreria Regensbergiana.
- Eubel, Conradus, ed. (1914). Hierarchia catholica (in Latin). Vol. Tomus 2 (second ed.). Münster: Libreria Regensbergiana.
- Eubel, Conradus; Gulik, Guilelmus, eds. (1923). Hierarchia catholica (in Latin). Vol. Tomus 3 (second ed.). Münster: Libreria Regensbergiana.
- Gauchat, Patritius (Patrice) (1935). Hierarchia catholica (in Latin). Vol. Tomus IV (1592-1667). Münster: Libraria Regensbergiana.
- Ritzler, Remigius; Sefrin, Pirminus (1952). Hierarchia catholica medii et recentis aevi (in Latin). Vol. Tomus V (1667-1730). Patavii: Messagero di S. Antonio.
- Ritzler, Remigius; Sefrin, Pirminus (1958). Hierarchia catholica medii et recentis aevi. Vol. Tomus VI (1730-1799). Patavii: Messagero di S. Antonio.
- Ritzler, Remigius; Sefrin, Pirminus (1968). Hierarchia Catholica medii et recentioris aevi (in Latin). Vol. VII (1800–1846). Monasterii: Libreria Regensburgiana.
- Remigius Ritzler; Pirminus Sefrin (1978). Hierarchia catholica Medii et recentioris aevi (in Latin). Vol. VIII (1846–1903). Il Messaggero di S. Antonio.
- Pięta, Zenon (2002). Hierarchia catholica medii et recentioris aevi (in Latin). Vol. IX (1903–1922). Padua: Messagero di San Antonio. ISBN 978-88-250-1000-8.

=== Studies ===
- Bocchini Camianai, Bruna (1992). "I vescovi toscani nel periodo lorenese," in: Istituzioni e società in Toscana nell’età moderna. Atti delle giornate di studio dedicate a Giuseppe Pansini (Firenze, 4–5 dicembre 1992). Roma: Ministero per i beni culturali. Ufficio centrale per i beni archivistici, 1992. pp. 681–715.
- Cappelletti, Giuseppe (1862). Le chiese d'Italia dalla loro origine sino ai nostri giorni (in Italian). Vol. decimosettimo. Venezia: Antonelli. pp. 367–559.
- Kehr, Paul Fridolin (1908). Italia pontificia. vol. III. Berlin 1908. pp. 268–278. (in Latin)
- Lanzoni, Francesco (1927). Le diocesi d'Italia dalle origini al principio del secolo VII (an. 604). Faenza: F. Lega. pp. 564–568. (in Italian)
- Pecci, Giovanni Antonio (1748). Storia del Vescovado della città di Siena (in Italian). Lucca: Marescandoli.
- Lotti, A. (1992). La chiesa di Siena a i suoi vescovi. Siena 1992. (in Italian)
- Sangalli, Maurizio (2003). Il seminario di Siena: da arcivescovile a regionale : 1614-1953, 1953-2003 (in Italian). Soveria Mannelli (Catanzaro): Rubbettino Editore. pp. 120–. ISBN 978-88-498-0678-6.
- Schneider, Feodor, ed. (1911). Regestum Senese (Rome, 1911). (in Latin)
- Schwartz, Gerhard (1913), Die Besetzung der Bistümer Reichsitaliens unter den sächsischen und salischen Kaisern : mit den Listen der Bischöfe, 951-1122, Leipzig-Berlin 1913, pp. 221–223. (in German)
- Ughelli, Ferdinando; Coleti, Nicolo (1718). Italia sacra sive de Episcopis Italiae, et insularum adjacentium (in Latin). Vol. Tomus tertius (secunda ed.). Venice: Apud Sebastianum Coleti. pp. 523–584.
