= Gaetano Bonicelli =

Italian Catholic archbishop of Siena-Colle di Val d'Elsa-Montalcino

- Archbishop emeritus of the Archdiocese of Siena–Colle di Val d'Elsa–Montalcino
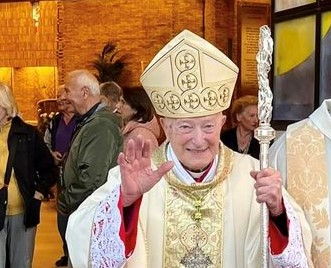
- Bonicelli in 2023
- Church: Roman Catholic Church
- See: Roman Catholic Archdiocese of Siena–Colle di Val d'Elsa–Montalcino
- Appointed: 14 November 1989
- Installed: 14 January 1990
- Term ended: 23 May 2001
- Predecessor: Ismaele Mario Catellano
- Successor: Antonio Buoncristiani

Orders
- Ordination: 22 May 1948 by Adriano Bernareggi
- Consecration: 26 August 1975 by Antonio Poma

Personal details
- Born: 13 December 1924 (age 101) Vilminore di Scalve, Province of Bergamo, Kingdom of Italy
- Coat of arms

Gaetano Bonicelli (born 13 December 1924) is an Italian Roman Catholic prelate who was archbishop of Siena-Colle di Val d'Elsa-Montalcino from 1989 to 2001.

== Biography ==
Gaetano Bonicelli was ordained a priest on 22 May 1948, and was ordained to the clergy of the bishopric. After missionary work in Belgium in 1965, he became director of the Italian Bureau of Emigration and Tourism. In 1973, Bonicelli rose to the position of Assistant Secretary of the Conference of Italian Bishops.

On 28 October 1981, Pope John Paul II appointed him Titular Archbishop of Italica and Archbishop of the Italian Military Ordinariate. On 14 November 1989, he was named Archbishop of Siena-Colle di Val d'Elsa-Montalcino.

On 23 May 2001, Bonicelli announced his retirement due to age. Since then, Gaetano Bonicelli has been living in a pilgrim's house in Stezzano, near Bergamo.
