= The Holy Family with Saint John the Baptist and an Angel =

Painting by Giovanni Antonio Bazzi (aka Il Sodoma)

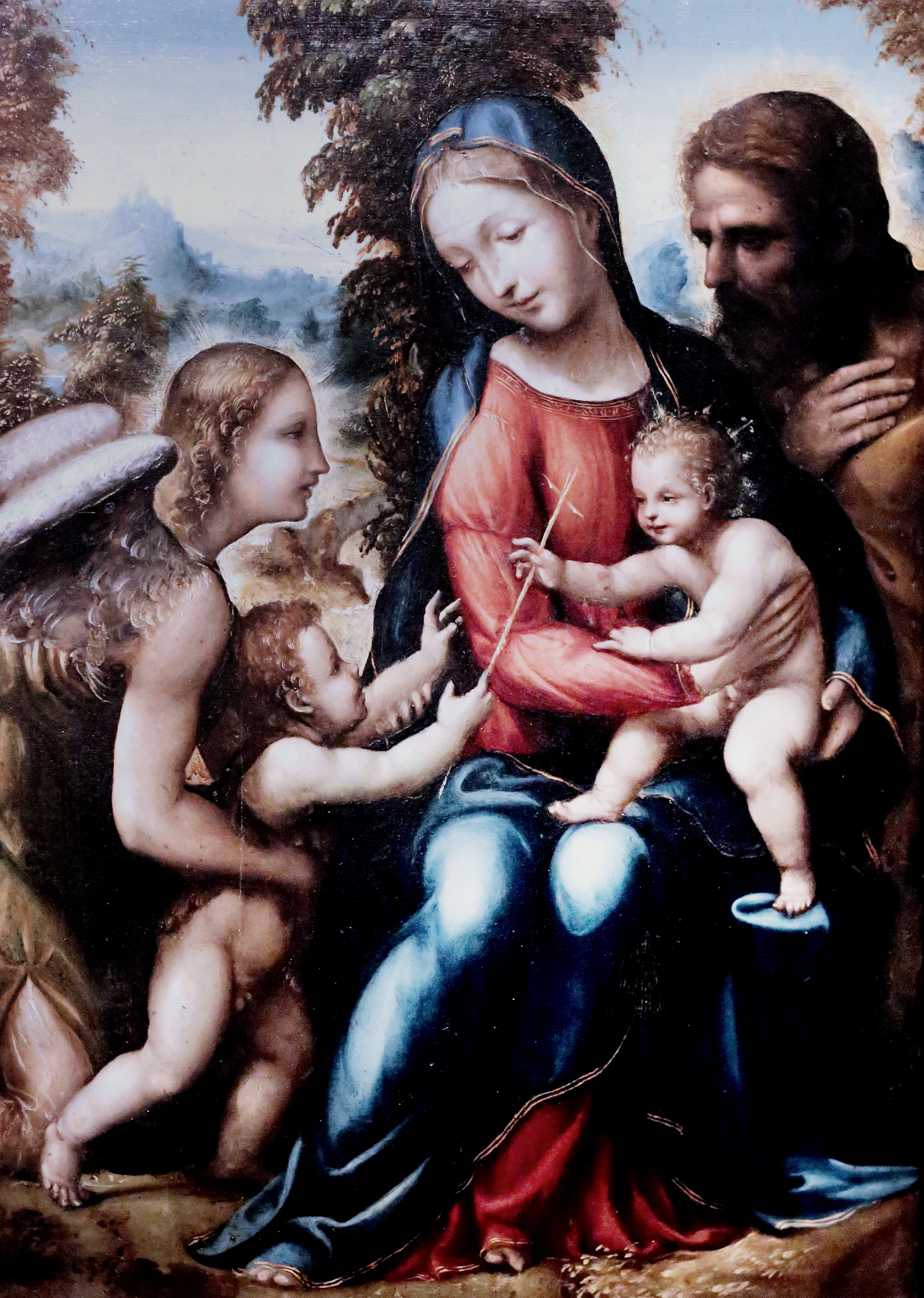
- Artist: Il Sodoma
- Year: between circa 1535 and circa 1540
- Medium: oil painting on panel (poplar)
- Movement: Italian Renaissance; Catholic art Sienese School
- Subject: Holy Family with John the Baptist and an angel
- Dimensions: 79 cm × 57 cm (31 in × 22 in)
- Location: Musée des Beaux-Arts, Strasbourg
- Accession: 1894

The Holy Family with Saint John the Baptist and an Angel is a religious painting by the Italian Renaissance artist Giovanni Antonio Bazzi aka Il Sodoma, dated to c. 1535–1540. It is now in the Musée des Beaux-Arts of Strasbourg, France. Its inventory number is 351.

The painting was bought in Florence in 1894 by Wilhelm von Bode, and was identified as a Sodoma from the start, although some Fin de siècle critics expressed their disregard for what they considered "a badly restored work" (as it turned out after thorough scientific examination in 1978, the work had in fact not been substantially altered at all). Until the 2010s, Holy Family with Saint John the Baptist and an Angel had been considered as a work from Sodoma's early period, predating his journey to Rome in 1509, but stylistic and iconographic examinations from 2017 have established that it has much more probably been painted in Siena in the second half of the 1530s.

The Holy Family with Saint John the Baptist and an Angel is one of Sodoma's multiple variations on the extended theme (Holy Family, Holy Family with John the Baptist, Holy Family with John the Baptist and an angel), and quite characteristic for his style. One original aspect of the Strasbourg version is the unusual posture of the (rather feminine) angel, who appears to hold John the Baptist in a motherly fashion.
