= Gerolamo Giovenone =

Italian painter

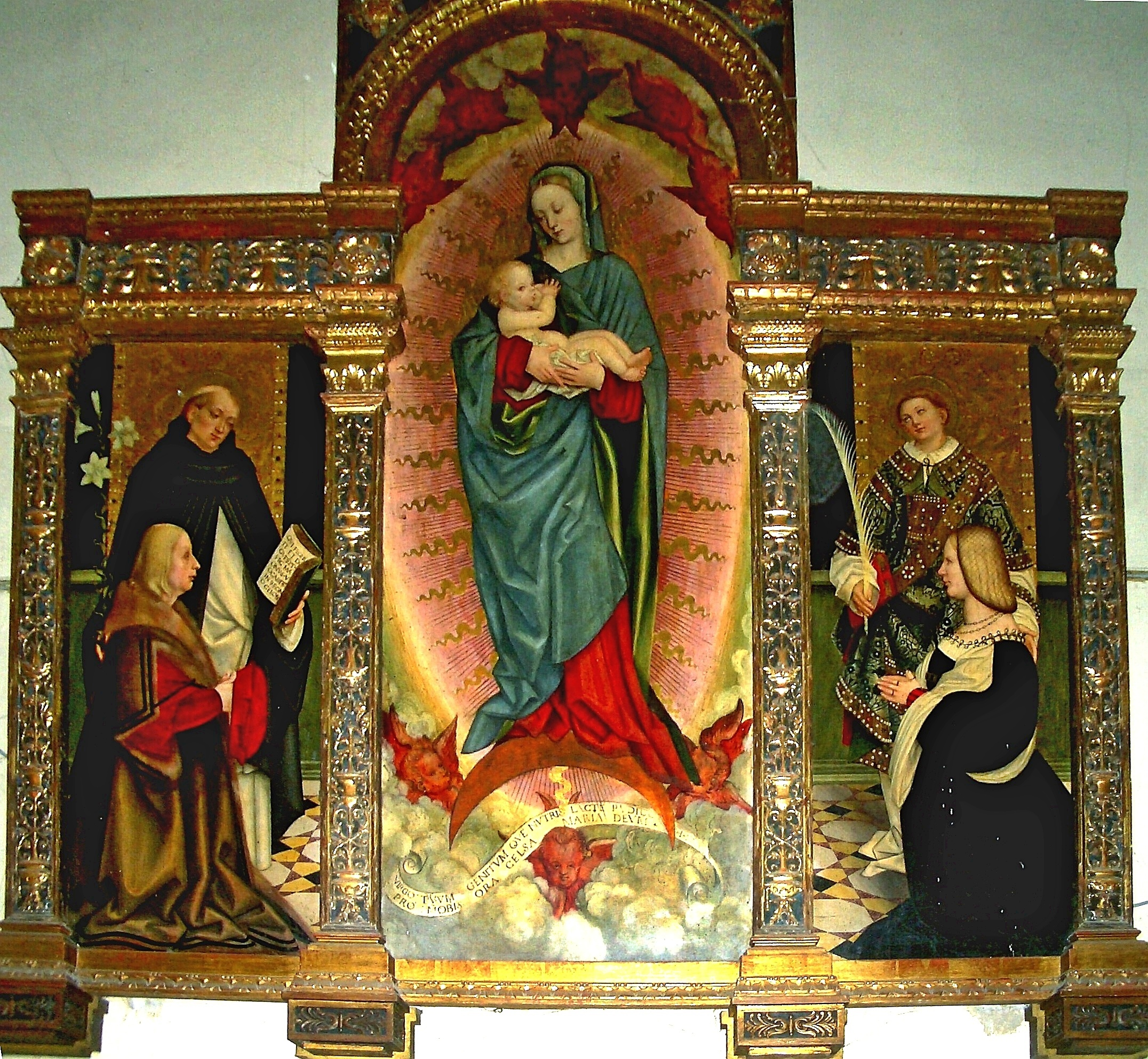
Madonna Lactans, (Trittico Raspa), 1516, oil on canvas, Trino, near Vercelli, region of Piedmont Italy.

Gerolamo Giovenone (1486/1487 – 1555), also spelled Girolamo, was an Italian painter of the early Renaissance period, active mainly in Milan. He was born in Vercelli. He was the teacher of the painter Gaudenzio Ferrari and possibly also taught il Sodoma. In Milan, he painted the Resurrection for the church of the Augustines. An altarpiece fragment depicting an Adoration of the Virgin and Child by Saints Nicola da Tolentino and Eusebius is displayed by the Museo Borgogna in Vercelli. A Virgin and Child with Saints is found at the National Gallery in London. Another of his pupils was Franchino Ferrari, born 1484 in Valduggia, and active in Vercelli. His works also include the Buronzo Altarpiece.
