= Antonio Piccolomini =

Roman Catholic prelate

Most Reverend Antonio Piccolomini
- Archbishop of Siena
- Church: Catholic Church
- Archdiocese: Archdiocese of Siena
- In office: 1458–1459
- Predecessor: Enea Silvio Piccolomini
- Successor: Francesco Todeschini-Piccolomini

Orders
- Consecration: 16 April 1459

Personal details
- Died: 8 November 1459 Siena, Italy

Antonio Piccolomini, O.S.B. (died 1459) was a Roman Catholic prelate who served as Archbishop of Siena (1459) and Bishop of Siena (1458–1459).

== Biography ==
Antonio Piccolomini was the son of Andrea Piccolomini, of the lords of Modanella, in the same branch of the Piccolomini family as Pope Pius II.

He was ordained a priest in the Order of Saint Benedict. He was appointed abbot of the Camaldolese monastery of S. Vigilio in Siena, which was under the patronage of the Piccolomini family. He was succeeded by Francesco Todeschini-Piccolomini (Pope Pius III), who was named Abbot Commendatory in 1458.

On 18 September 1458, Antonio was appointed Bishop of Siena by the newly-elected Pope Pius II, who had just vacated the bishopric of Siena. Pius II granted him the privilege of being consecrated a bishop by any bishop he chose who was in communion with Rome. As bishop-elect, he took possession of his new diocese on 28 September 1458. On 16 April 1459, he was consecrated bishop, though the names of the consecrators remain unknown.

On 18 April 1459, at the urging and with the cooperation of Pius II, who lent Bishop Antonio the services of Agapito Cincio de' Rusticii, a Referendary and Auditor Causarum in the papal Court, there was issued a new Constitution for the diocese, consisting of fifty-six articles.

On 23 April 1459, Pope Pius II elevated the diocese of Siena, of which he had recently been the bishop, to the rank of Metropolitan Archbishop of Siena.

Antonio Piccolomini served as Archbishop of Siena a total of seventeen months, until his death on 8 November 1459. He had gone to Monte Amiata to the baths of S. Filippo, for health reasons, and died at the castle of Crevole, which belonged to the bishops of Siena. He was succeeded on 6 February 1460 by Francesco Todeschini-Piccolomini.

== External links and additional sources ==
Catholic Church titles
Preceded by Enea Silvio Piccolomini	Bishop and Archbishop of Siena; 1458–1459	Succeeded by Francesco Todeschini-Piccolomini
