= Giomo del Sodoma =

Italian painter

Giomo del Sodoma, also known as Girolamo Magagni (1507–1563) was an Italian painter, pupil of Il Sodoma and active in painted sacred subjects.

He is recalled by Giorgio Vasari as an imitator of Sodoma who stole works from his master's studio while the latter was ill in Florence. There are paintings by Giomo in the Pinacoteca Nazionale di Siena.
