= Chapel of the Madonna del Rosario, Siena =

Former Church in Siena, today staple of the Contrada Chiocciola

Coordinates: 43.312845°N 11.327327°E

The Chapel of the Madonna del Rosario is a small, Baroque style, originally Roman Catholic, but now deconsecrated oratory located between via San Marco and via della Diana in the contrada of the Chiocciola (snail), in the city of Siena, Tuscany, Italy. It association with the neighborhood also gained the scenic building the name of the Chapel of the Chiocciola. The chapel is located some 200 meters west and uphill of Porta San Marco

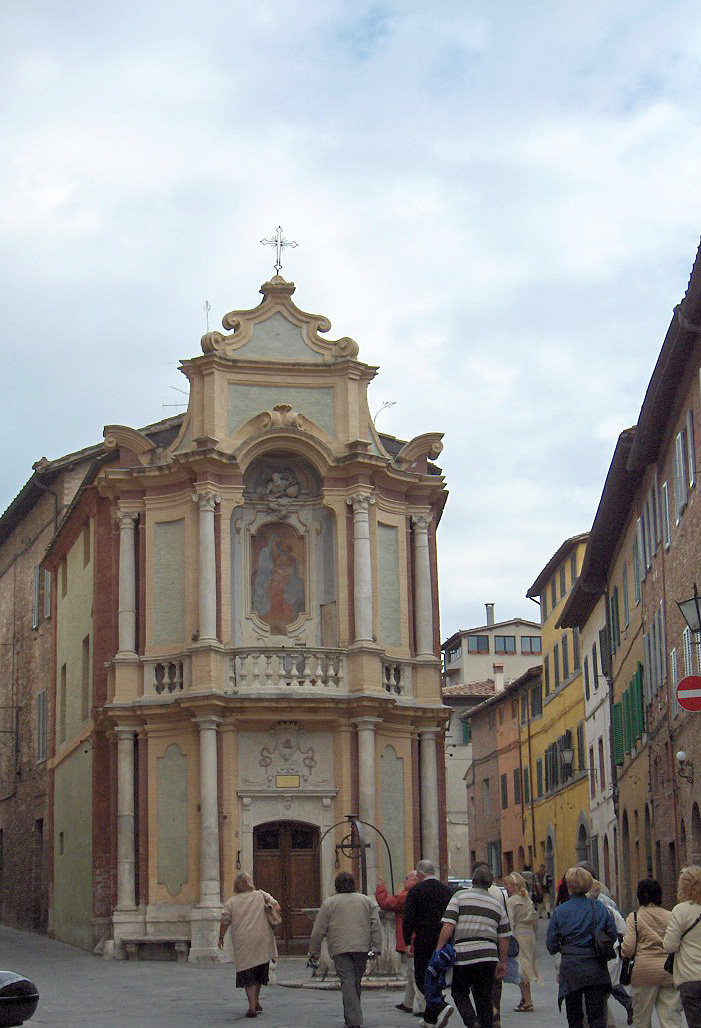
Facade of the Chapel

== History ==
The oratory was built with funds provided by the neighborhood between 1655 and 1656, designed by Giacomo Franchini, and has stucco decoration by Pietro d'Austo Montini. In the facade, the stucco God the father with angels emerges above the repainted fresco of the Madonna and child painted in 1742 by Francesco Feliciati. Below is a primitive fresco of a snail. The site originally held an icon of the Virgin painted by Jacopo di Mino del Pellicciaio. The oratory was deconsecrated in 1813, and became an armory. The well in front of the church was built in the early 16th century.

The former church is now used as a place to rest horses after the Palio, and the interior artwork and devotional services were moved to the nearby Oratory of Santi Pietro e Paolo.
