= Lucifer of Siena =

Bishop

Lucifer of Siena (3rd century – 4th century), was the first bishop of Siena. He was appointed in 306, two years after the death of Saint Ansano.
