= Il Sodoma =

Italian Renaissance painter (1477–1549)

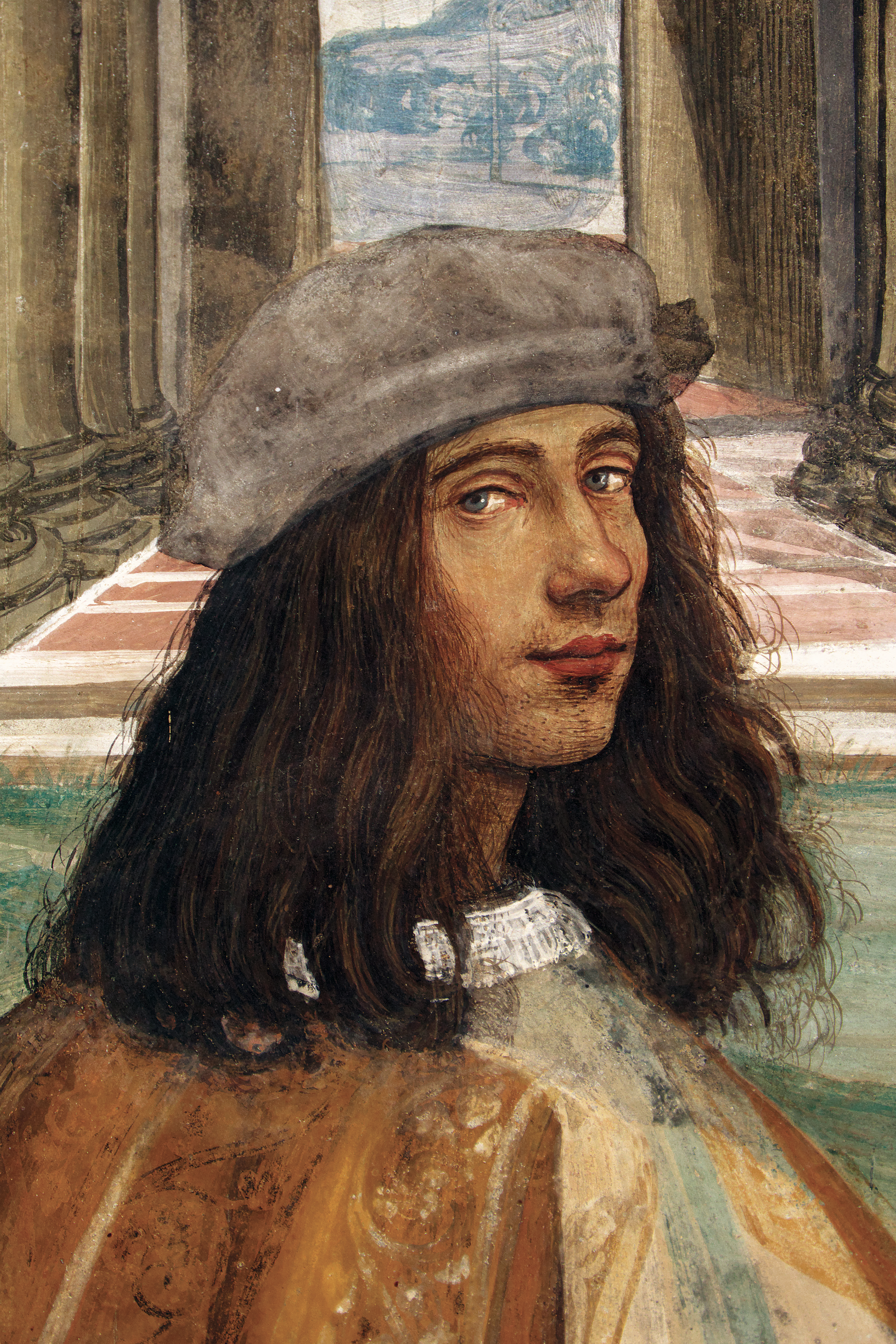
- Self-portrait, detail of fresco St Benedict repairs a Broken Colander through Prayer, Chiostro Grande, Abbazia territoriale di Monte Oliveto Maggiore
- Born: Giovanni Antonio Bazzi; 1477; Vercelli, Duchy of Savoy
- Died: 14 February 1549 (aged 71–72); Siena, Republic of Siena
- Education: Martino Spanzotti, Gerolamo Giovenone
- Movement: High Renaissance Sienese School
- Patrons: Agostino Chigi, Pope Julius II, Pope Leo X

Giovanni Antonio Bazzi (Note: Also wrongly spelt Razzi.) (1477 – 14 February 1549), known as Il Sodoma ("The [One from] Sodom"), (Note: The artist's real surname is uncertain. He is said to have borne the family name of Sodona but also the name Tizzioni. Sodona is the signature on some of his pictures. While Bazzi was corrupted into Razzi, Sodona may have been corrupted into Sodoma (Latin and Italian for the biblical city of Sodom).) was an Italian Renaissance painter. Having spent the bulk of his professional life in Siena, with two periods in Rome, he painted in a manner that superimposed the High Renaissance style of early 16th-century Rome onto the traditions of the provincial Sienese school.

== Biography ==
Giovanni Bazzi was born in Vercelli, then in the Duchy of Savoy, in 1477. His first master was the "archaic" Martino Spanzotti; (Note: A minor painter, called "archaic" by Freedberg 1993:117, of whom one signed picture is known.) he also appears to have been a student of the painter Giovenone. After acquiring the strong colouring and other distinctive stylistic features of the Lombard school and – though he is not known to have travelled to Milan (Note: Morelli, in his Italian Pictures in German Galleries, said that he ripened into an artist only during two years (1498–1500) that he spent with Leonardo in Milan.) – somehow absorbing the superficial mannerisms of Leonardo, he travelled to Siena before 1503, perhaps at the behest of agents of the Spannocchi family, and began with fresco cycles for Olivetan monks and a series of small Ovidian ceiling panels and a frieze depicting the career of Julius Caesar for Sigismondo Chigi at Palazzo Chigi. (Note: Sigismondo was the guarantor of Sodoma's performance for Julius, in October 1508, and his brother Agostino became Sodoma's notable patron.)

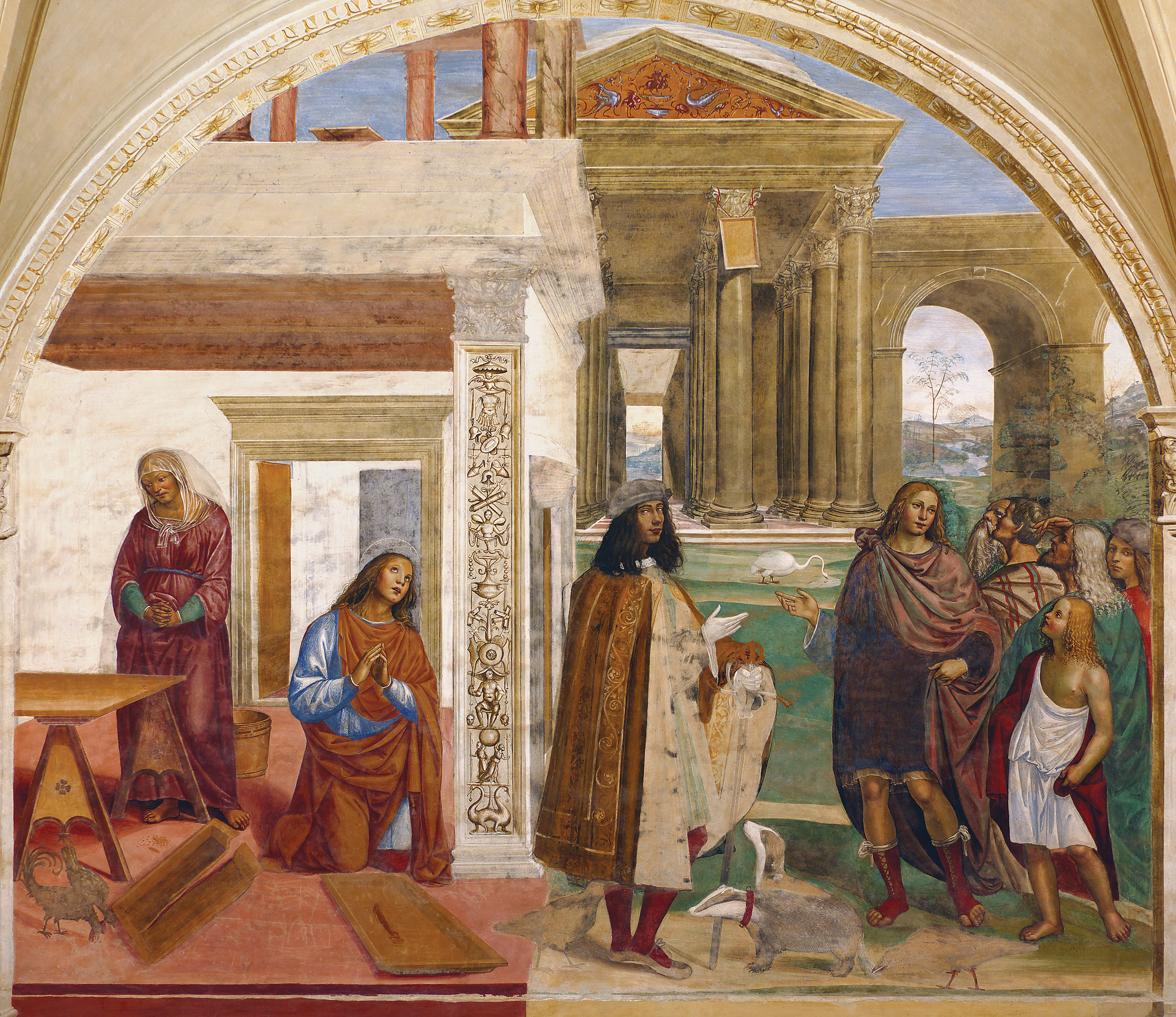
St Benedict repairs a Broken Colander through Prayer (c. 1502), Chiostro Grande, Monte Oliveto Maggiore Abbey

Along with Pinturicchio, Sodoma was one of the first to practice in Siena the style of the High Renaissance. His first important works were frescoes in the Benedictine monastery of Monte Oliveto Maggiore, on the road from Siena to Rome, illustrating the life of St Benedict in continuation of the series that Luca Signorelli had begun in 1498. Gaining fluency in the prevailing popular style of Pinturicchio, Sodoma completed the set in 1502 and included a self-portrait with badgers and ravens.

Sodoma was invited to Rome in 1508 by the celebrated Sienese merchant Agostino Chigi and was employed there by Pope Julius II in the Stanza della Segnatura in the Vatican. He executed two great compositions and various ornaments and grotesques in vaulted ceilings divided into feigned compartments in the antique manner that Pinturicchio had recently revived, working at the same time as Raphael. Giorgio Vasari's rhetorical story that Sodoma's larger works did not satisfy the pope, who engaged Raphael to substitute a program of Justice, Poetry, and Theology, is not borne out by the documents. (Note: Recent cleaning revealed the essential integrity of Sodoma's existing ceilings.)

Before October 1510 he was in Siena, where he painted the exterior of Palazzo Chigi in monochrome chiaroscuro with scenes from the Bible and from Antiquity, the first such work seen in Siena. His painting at this time began to show distinct Florentine influences, especially of Fra Bartolommeo.

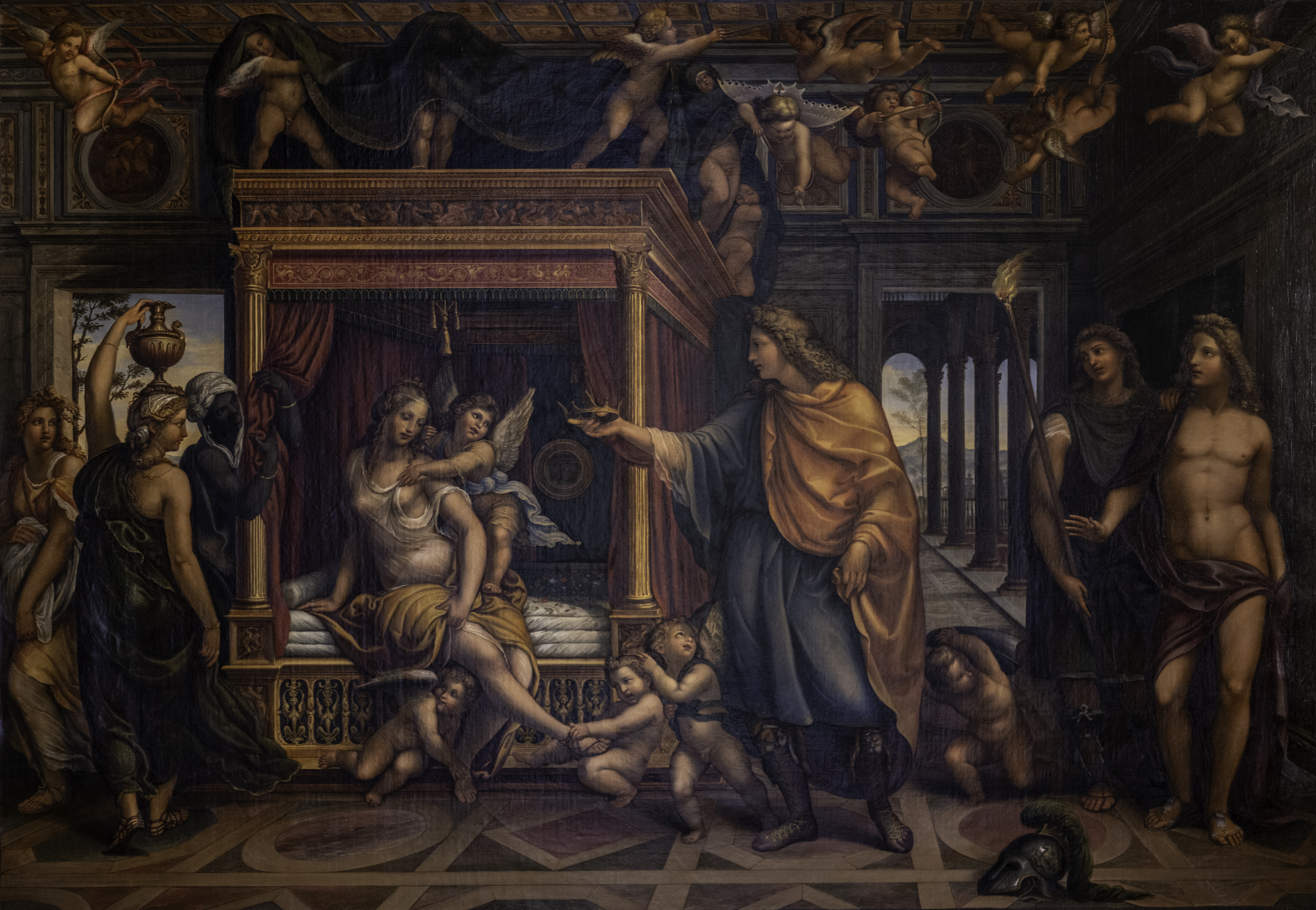
The Nuptials

Called again to Rome by Chigi, in the Villa Chigi (now the Villa Farnesina), working alongside Baldassarre Peruzzi, Sodoma painted subjects from the life of Alexander the Great: Alexander in the Tent of Darius and the Nuptials of the Conqueror with Roxanne, which some people consider his masterpiece. When Leo X became pope (1513), Sodoma presented him with a picture of the Death of Lucretia (or of Cleopatra, according to some accounts). Leo gave him a large sum of money as a reward and created him a cavaliere.

In his youth, Bazzi had married, but he and his wife soon separated. A daughter married Bartolomeo Neroni, called also Riccio Sanese or Maestro Riccio, one of his principal pupils. Bazzi acquired his nickname of Il Sodoma, as it were "the sodomite", from as early as 1512. This appears to have been one among various nicknames, he was also known as Mattaccio or Matazo ("the madman") among the monks of Monte Oliveto. It is due to the contemporary art historian Giorgio Vasari that Bazzi's nickname of Il Sodoma has become conventional. According to Vasari's testimony, Bazzi always surrounded himself with "boys and beardless youths, whom he loved more than was decent", for which reason he acquired the nickname Il Soddoma. Still, according to Vasari, Bazzi took pride in the nickname and composed stanzas and songs about it.

Bazzi returned to Siena and, at a later date, sought work in Pisa, Volterra, and Lucca. From Lucca, he returned to Siena not long before his death on 14 February 1549 (older narratives say 1554). He had supposedly squandered his property and is said, without documentary support, to have died in penury in the great hospital of Siena. One of his pupils is known as Giomo del Sodoma.

== Work ==
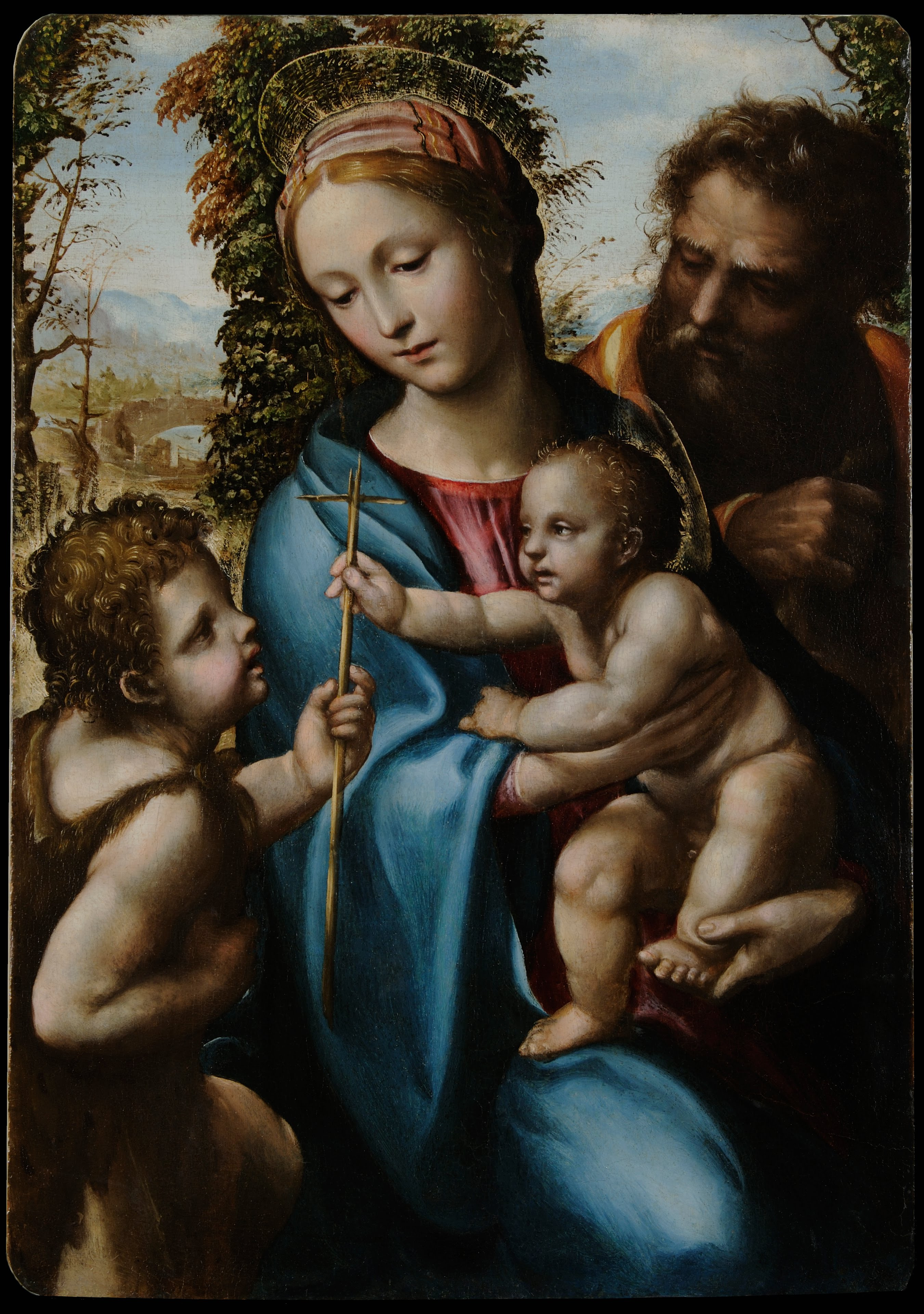
Holy Family with young Saint John

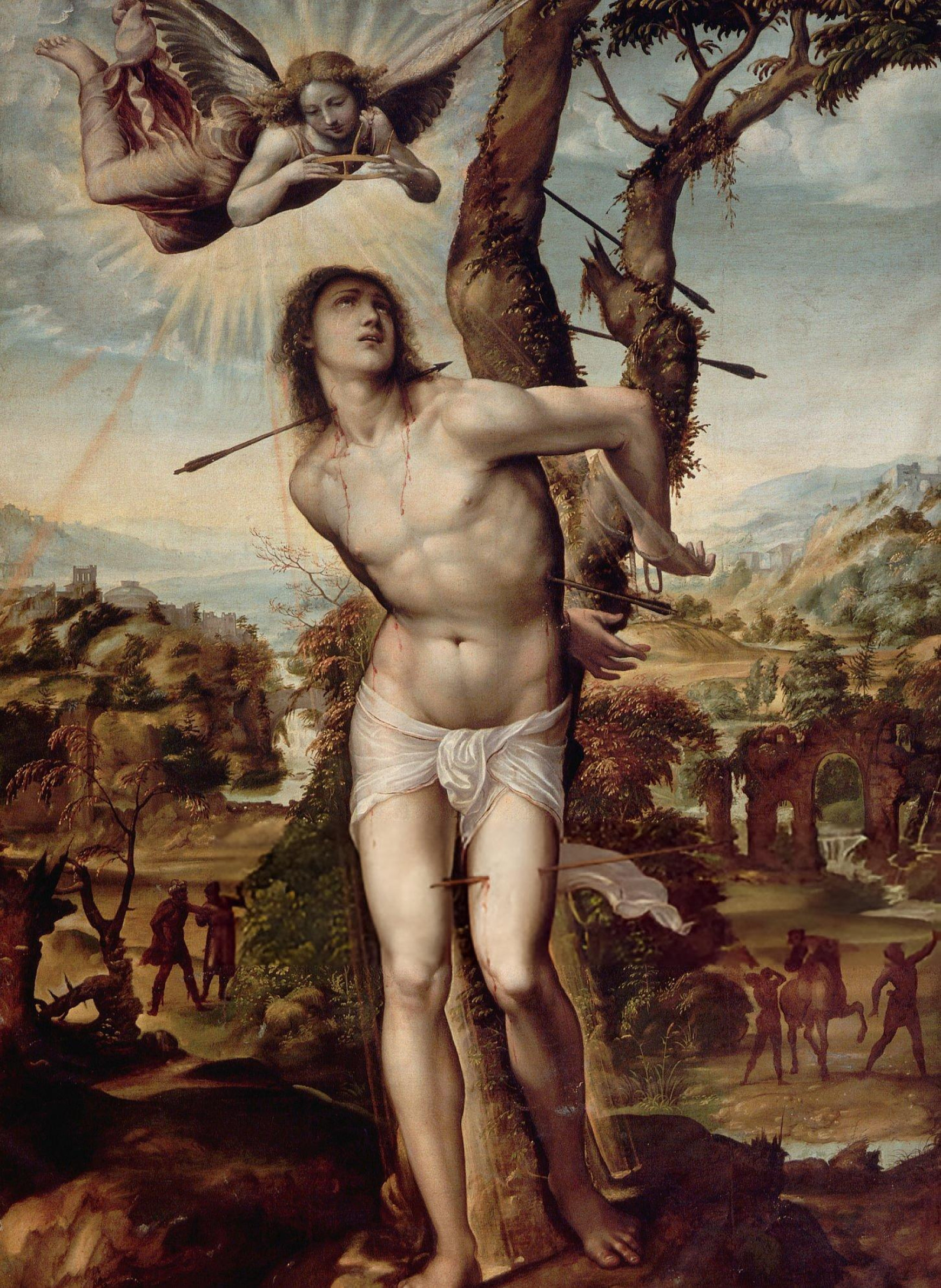
St. Sebastian (1525). Galleria degli Uffizi, Florence

Some critics see in Sodoma's Madonna in the Pinacoteca di Brera (if it really is by him) the direct influence of Leonardo da Vinci. Modern criticism tends not to follow Giovanni Morelli in supposing that Raphael painted Sodoma's portrait next to himself in The School of Athens, (Note: The face looks too old, apart from anything else; Perugino or Timoteo Viti are considered more likely models.) while a drawing at Christ Church is supposed to be a portrait of Raphael by Sodoma.

Among his masterpieces are the frescoes, completed in 1526, in the chapel of St. Catherine of Siena painted for the church of San Domenico (Siena), depicting the saint in ecstasy, fainting as she receives the Eucharist from an angel. In the Oratory of San Bernardino, are scenes from the history of the Virgin, painted in conjunction with Girolamo del Pacchia and Domenico di Pace Beccafumi (1536–1538). These frescoes depict the Visitation and the Assumption. In San Francesco are the Deposition from the Cross (1513) and Christ Scourged. Many critics regard one or the other of these paintings as Sodoma's masterpiece. In the choir of Pisa Cathedral is the Sacrifice of Abraham, and in the Uffizi Gallery of Florence a St. Sebastian.

Some of his works, including the Holy Family now in the Pinacoteca Nazionale (Siena) have been mistaken for works of Leonardo da Vinci. His easel pictures are rare; there are two in the National Gallery, London.

=== Partial list of works ===
- Flagellation of Christ (1510) - Museum of Fine Arts, Budapest
- The Road to Calvary (1510) - Museum of Fine Arts, Budapest
- Cinuzzi Deposition (before 1513) - Pinacoteca Nazionale, Siena
- The Death of Lucretia (1513) - Museum of Fine Arts, Budapest
- Saint George and Dragon (1518) - National Gallery of Art, Washington, D.C.
- Rape of the Sabine Women (1525) - Galleria Nazionale d'Arte Antica, Rome
- St. Sebastian (1525) - Oil on canvas, 206 x 154 cm Galleria degli Uffizi, Florence
- Three Fates (1525) -Galleria Nazionale d'Arte Antica Rome
- Adoration of the Magi (c. 1530) - Sant'Agostino, Siena (Note: A dispute concerning the painting and a tondo now in the Walters Art Museum, Baltimore, was resolved in 1536; Loseries notes a miniature dated 1532 that adapts Sodoma's composition.)
- Ordination of Saint Alfonso (1530) - Santo Spirito, Siena
- Crying for dead Christ or Pietà (1533) - Museo Soumaya, Mexico City
- Saint Jerome in Penitence (c. 1535–1545) - National Gallery, London
- The Holy Family with Saint John the Baptist and an Angel (c. 1535–1545) - Musée des Beaux-Arts de Strasbourg
- The Mystical Marriage of Saint Catherine (1539–1540) - Galleria Nazionale d'Arte Antica, Rome
- Pietà (1540) - Galleria Borghese, Rome
- Sacra Conversazione (1542) - Museo Nazionale di San Matteo, Pisa
- Saint Sebastian with Madonna and Angels (1542) - Museo Nazionale di San Matteo, Pisa
- Allegory of Celestial Love, Chigi-Saracini Collection, Siena
- Leda Galleria Borghese, Roma
- Santa Maddalena (Private collection)
- The Marriage of Alexander and Roxanne - Fresco, Villa Farnesina, Rome
- Procession to Calvary – Museum & Gallery, Inc., South Carolina
- Pietà (Private collection)

Media related to Sodoma at Wikimedia Commons

== Critical assessments ==
It is said that Sodoma jeered at Giorgio Vasari's Lives of the Artists and that Vasari repaid him by presenting a negative account of Sodoma's morals and demeanour and withholding praise of his work. According to Vasari, the name by which Bazzi was known was "Il Mattaccio" (the Madcap, the Maniac), this epithet having been bestowed upon him by the monks of Monte Oliveto. He dressed gaudily, like a mountebank, and his house was a Noah's Ark, owing to the strange miscellany of animals he kept there. He was a cracker of jokes and fond of music, and he sang poems composed by himself on indecorous subjects.

Vasari alleges that Sodoma was always a negligent artist, his early success in Siena, where he painted many portraits, being partly due to lack of competition, a judgment in which Sydney Freedberg concurs. Vasari asserts that as he aged, he became too "lazy" to make cartoons for his frescoes but daubed them straight onto the wall. Vasari nevertheless admits that Sodoma produced some works of very fine quality and that during his lifetime his reputation was high.

== Sources ==
- Cust, Robert H. Hobart (1906). Giovanni Antonio Bazzi. London: John Murray.
- Hayum, A. (1976). Giovanni Antonio Bazzi 'Il Sodoma'. New York: New York University.
- Carli, Enzo (1950). Sodoma.
- Marciano-Agostinelli Tozzi, Maria Teresa (1951). Sodoma. Messina: Tipografia ditta d'Amico.
- Freedberg, Sydney J. (1993). Painting in Italy 1500–1600. Penguin Books. pp. 117–19 et passim.
- Radini Tedeschi, Daniele (2008). Sodoma.
- Radini Tedeschi, Daniele (2010). Sodoma, la vita le opere e gli allievi di uno dei massimi artisti del Rinascimento.
- Zarucchi, Jeanne Morgan (May 2015). "Vasari's Biography of Bazzi as 'Soddoma:' Art History and Literary Analysis". Italian Studies. 70 (2): 167–190.
- Zarucchi, Jeanne Morgan (2017). "Félibien's Biography of 'Le Sodoma' and the Politics of Immorality". French Studies Bulletin. 38.1 (142): 7–10.
