= Niccolò Franchini =

Italian painter (1704–1783)

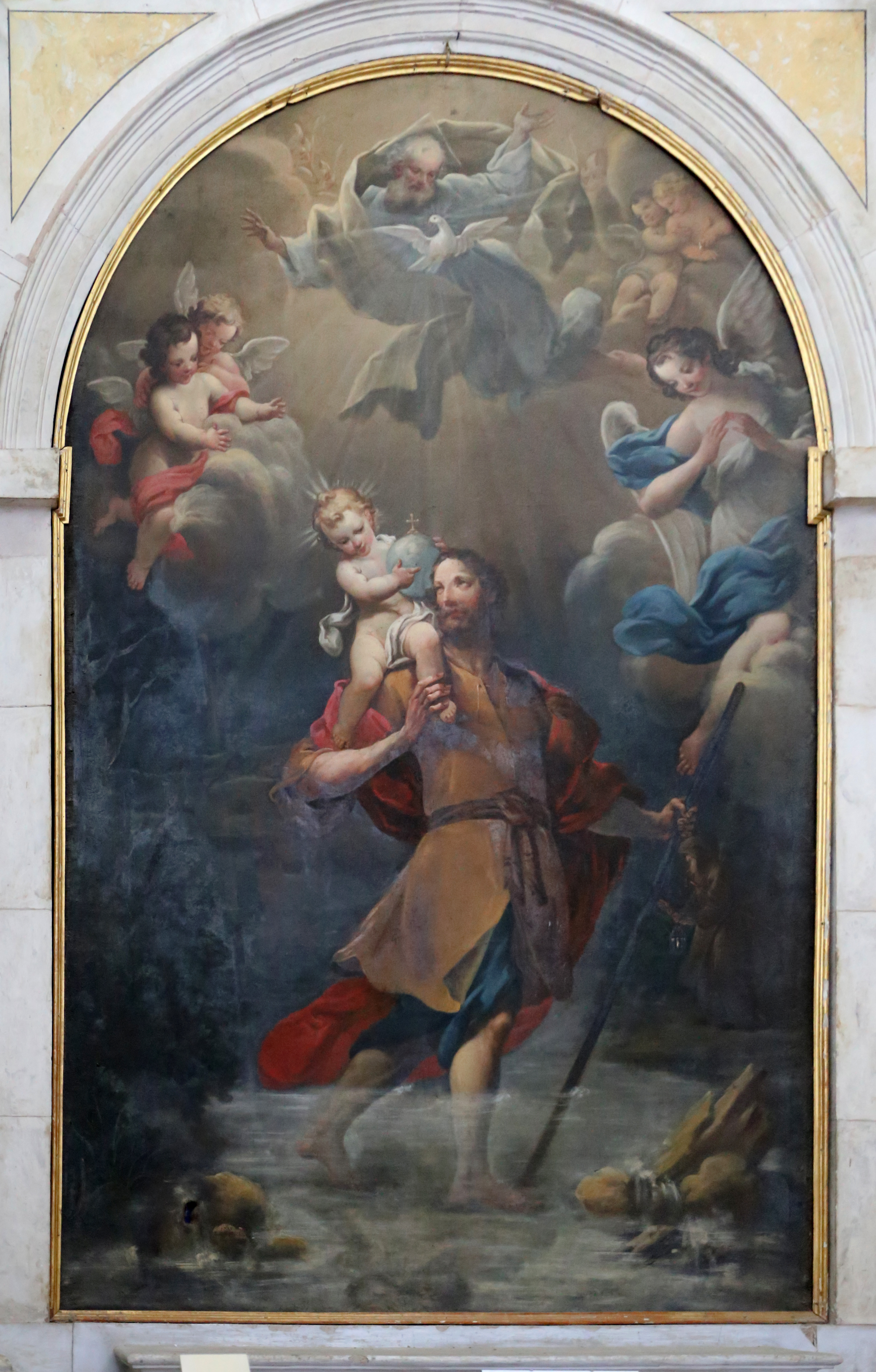
Photo of Niccolò Franchini

Niccolò Franchini (1704-1783) was an Italian painter, active in Siena, depicting mainly religious canvases in a late-Baroque style. Niccolò Franchini (1704-1783) was an Italian painter, active in Siena, depicting mainly religious canvases in a late-Baroque style.

== Biography ==
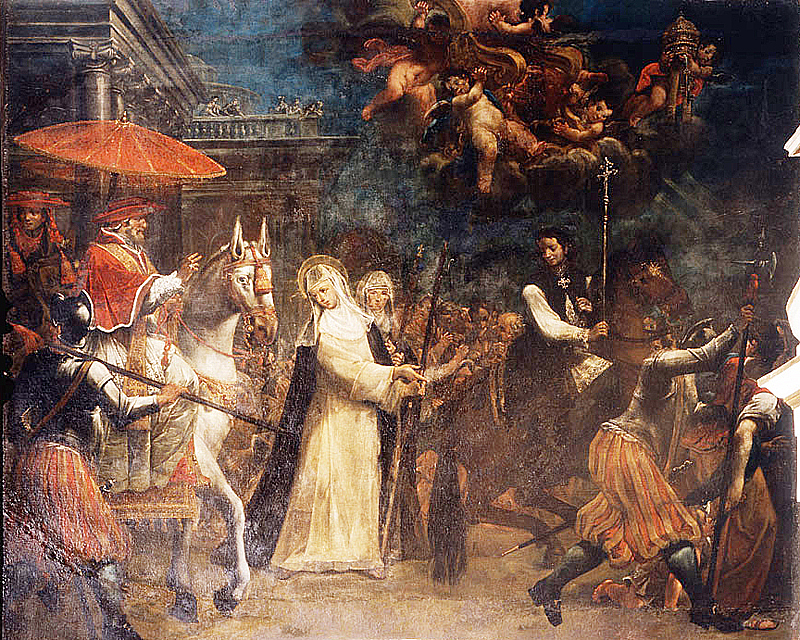
Return of Pope Gregory XI to Rome with Catherine of Siena .

The Bichi Chapel of the Church of Sant'Agostino has an altarpiece of San Cristoforo (1755) that replaced the former triptych by Luca Signorelli. He also has works in the church of San Giorgio in Siena. He also painted the ceiling of the oratory of the painters' guild in Siena, adjacent to the church of San Vigilio. He painted a Return of Pope Gregory XI to Rome with Catherine of Siena once in the Oratory of the Santissimo Crocefisso in Siena.

Luigi Lanzi in his exhaustive review of Italian painters places him at the end of the decline in Sienese painters, citing only praises in his roles as a restorer:

in restoring injured specimens to their original beauty, without applying to them a fresh pencil, and in supplying the faded colours with others taken from paintings of less value, he entitled himself, in fact, to the praise of a new discovery.
