= Agostino Chigi =

Italian banker and patron of the Renaissance

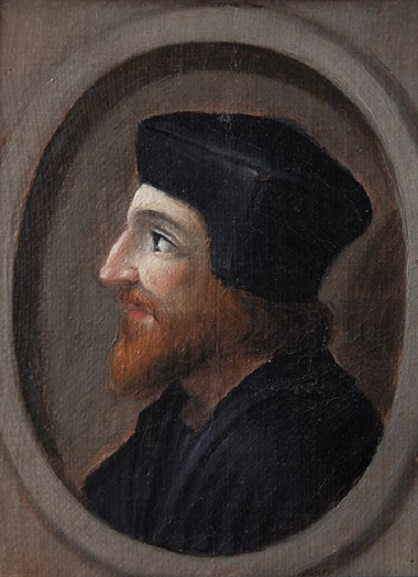
- Born: Agostino Andrea Chigi; November 29, 1466; Siena, Republic of Siena
- Died: April 11, 1520 (aged 53); Rome, Papal States
- Occupations: Banker, entrepreneur and shipowner
- Father: Mariano Chigi

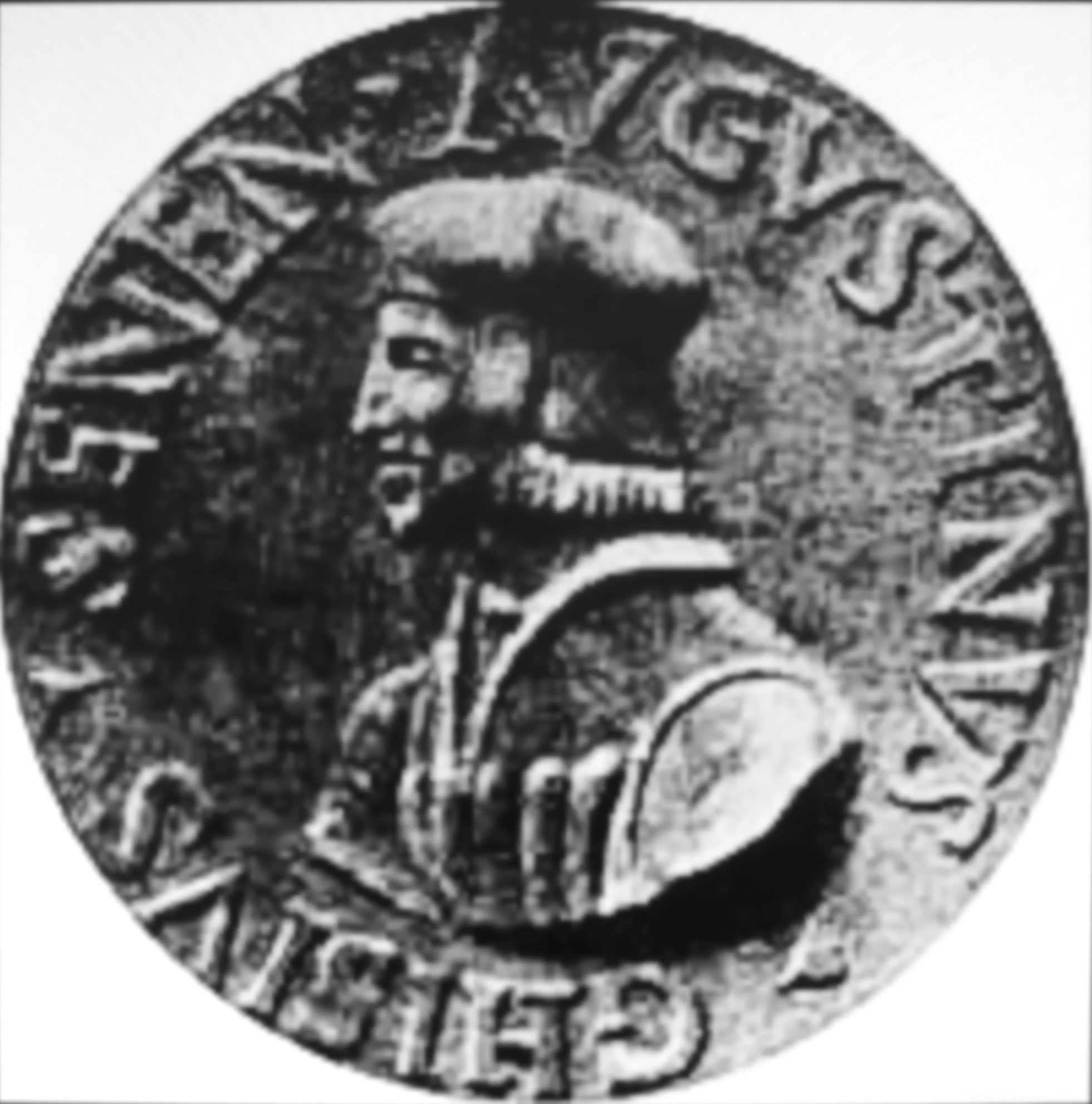
Coin with the effigy of Agostino Chigi

Agostino Andrea Chigi (29 November 1466 – April 11, 1520) was an Italian banker and patron of the Renaissance.

Born in Siena, he was the son of the prominent banker Mariano Chigi, a member of the ancient and illustrious Chigi family. He moved to Rome around 1487, collaborating with his father. The heir of a rich fund of capital, and enriched further after lending huge amounts of money to Pope Alexander VI (and to other rulers of the time as well), he strayed from common mercantile practice by obtaining lucrative monopolies like the salt monopoly of the Papal States and the Kingdom of Naples, as well as that of the alum excavated in Tolfa, Agnato and Ischia di Castro. Alum was an essential mordant in the textile industry.

After the death of the Borgia pope Alexander VI and his short-lived Sienese successor Pius III Piccolomini, he helped Pope Julius II in the expenses attendant upon his election. The latter rewarded him, linking Chigi to the della Rovere family, and creating him treasurer and notary of the Apostolic Camera. The personal bond between the Pope and his banker remained close: Agostino accompanied Julius in the field in both his great military campaigns of 1506 and 1510. In 1511 Agostino was sent to Venice to buy Venetian support for the papal forces in the War of the League of Cambrai.

Agostino established economic ties with the whole of Western Europe, at one time having up to 20,000 employees, receiving from Siena the title of Il Magnifico ("Magnificent").

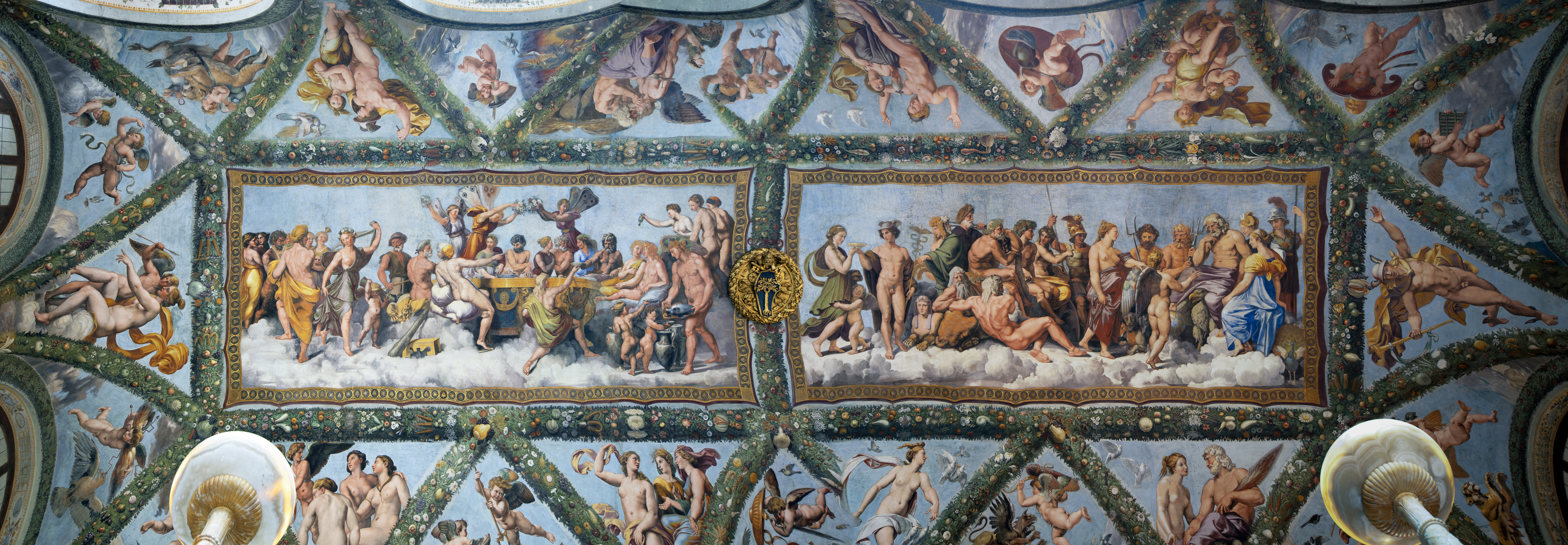
Details of the decorations of the Loggia di Psiche in the Villa Farnesina, Agostino Chigi's villa in Rome.

Chigi, "indisputably the richest man in Rome", became also a rich patron of art and literature, the protector of Pietro Aretino among others, though his own education suffered many lacunae, notably his lack of Latin. His Venetian mistress Francesca Ordeaschi was the toast of Rome. His artistic protégés included almost all the main figures of the early 16th century: Perugino (from whom he commissioned the eponymous Chigi Altarpiece), Sebastiano del Piombo, Giovanni da Udine, Giulio Romano, Sodoma and Raphael.

In Rome, Chigi's three artistic commissions involving Raphael remain the most prominent monuments of his contemporary fame: a chapel in Santa Maria della Pace; his mortuary chapel, the Chigi Chapel in Santa Maria del Popolo; and the suburban villa known since 1579 as the Villa Farnesina, all of them intended to give substance to his legend. His splendid villa that he built on the shore of the Tiber, in Trastevere, bears the name of its later owners: Villa Farnesina (illustration). For its design, Chigi employed the Sienese painter Baldassare Peruzzi, virtually untried as an architect. Sebastiano del Piombo, Giovanni da Udine, Giulio Romano, Sodoma and Raphael were called upon to provide the decoration. Here Raphael frescoed his Triumph of Galatea. Here Chigi held sumptuous repasts. In order to show his contempt of money, he was said to have all the silver dishes thrown into the river after the end of the parties; however, his servants were secretly ready to recollect them with nets draped under the windows. The villa called the Viridario in Chigi's time served as banking facility as well as residence, setting Chigi apart from the ordinary run of bankers in Rome, who normally resided in a piano nobile directly above but unconnected to their street-level botteghe (it:bottega, place of business).
