= Agostino Fantastici =

Italian architect, scenic designer, and writer

Agostino Fantastici (1782 – 1845) was an Italian scenic designer and architect, mainly active in Siena, Italy. He also wrote books of poetry.

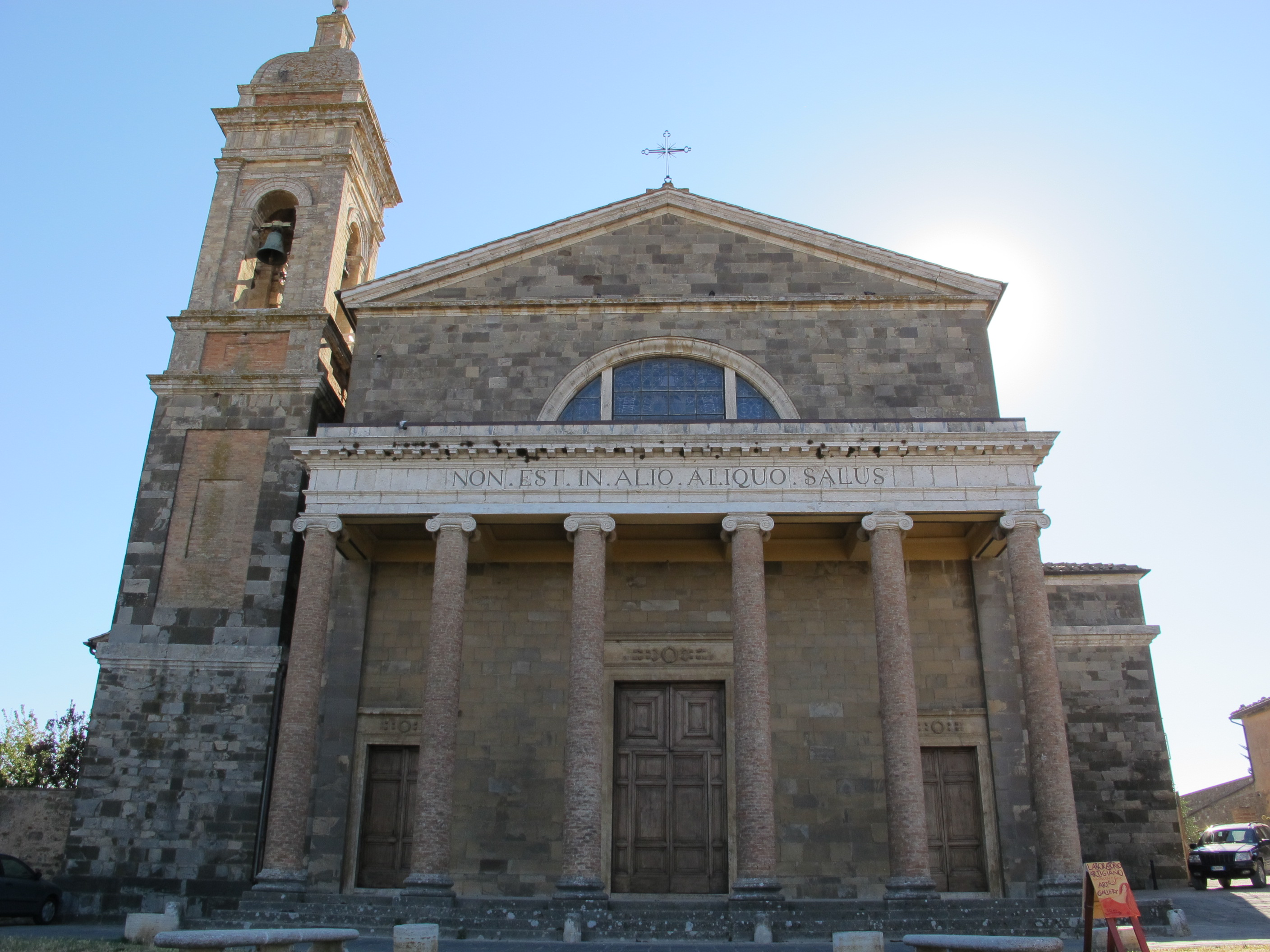
Facade of Duomo of Montalcino

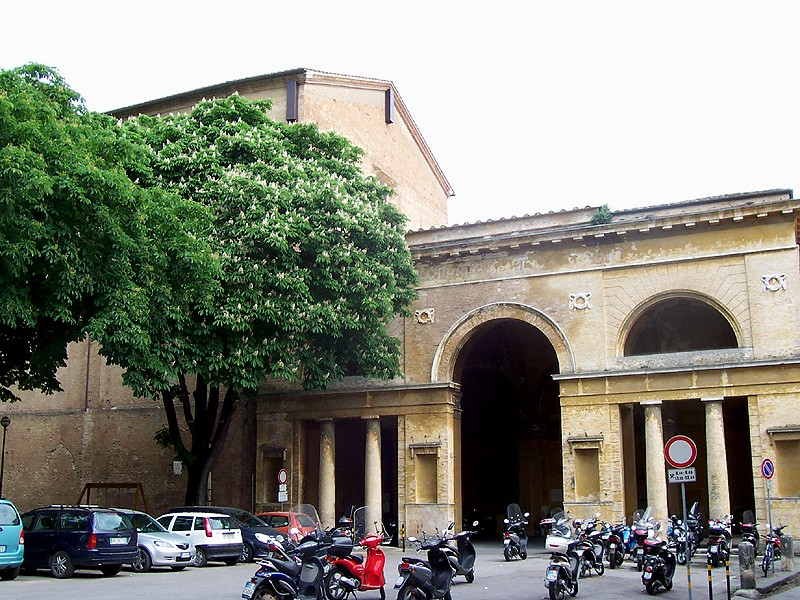
Chiesa di Sant'Agostino and Collegio Tolomei (right side)

== Biography ==
He was born in Montalcino, but his father Bernardino was a teacher of arithmetic and perspective associated with the University of Siena. He also worked as a hydraulic engineer.

After classical studies at the University of Siena, he traveled to Rome to study in the Accademia di San Luca under the neoclassical architect Raffaele Stern. In 1809, he returned to Siena and worked for a couple of years alongside Lorenzo Turillazzi. He spent most of the rest of his career in Siena, where he died.

His work as an architect in Siena often led him to antiquarian reconstructions, often attempting to replicate or emulate the original design of the building. His monograph, Vocabolario di architettura: prima edizione was republished in 1994.

Among his architectural restructuring and designs in and around Siena are:

- Farmacia Quattro Cantoni
- Sant'Agostino, reconstruction
- Santi Pietro e Paolo, Lantern reconstructed (1818).
- Palazzo Chigi Saracini, refurbishment/decoration of interiors.
- Montalcino Cathedral, Neoclassical facade (1832).
- Colle di Val d'Elsa Cathedral, Neoclassical facade.
- Villa il Pavone reconstruction (1825).
