= Sebastiano Folli =

Italian painter

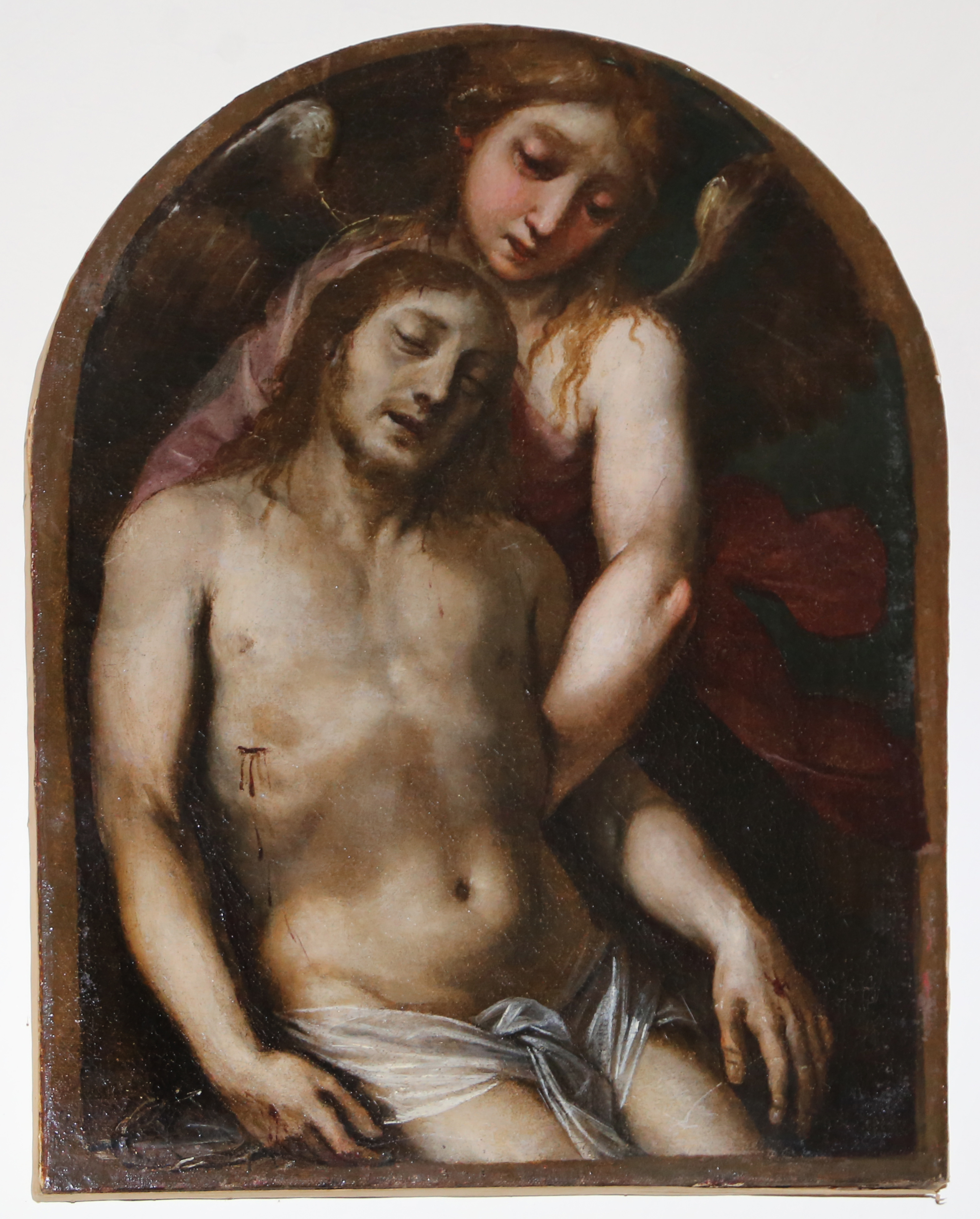
- Our Lady of Pity, Roccalbegna Art Museum
- Born: 1568; Siena, Grand Duchy of Tuscany
- Died: 2 February 1621 (aged 52–53); Siena, Grand Duchy of Tuscany
- Education: Alessandro Casolano
- Known for: Painting
- Movement: Renaissance

Sebastiano Folli (1568 – 2 February 1621) was an Italian painter of the late Renaissance period. He was a scholar of Alessandro Casolano, and a native of Siena. He distinguished himself by several frescoes in the churches at Siena, particularly the cupola of Santa Marta, and some subjects from the Life of St. Sebastian, in the church of that saint, painted in competition with Rutilio Manetti, to whose pictures they are in no way inferior. He visited Rome, and was employed in some considerable works for the Cardinal de' Medici, afterwards Leo XI. He died in 1621.

== Works ==
=== In Siena ===
- Basilica of San Domenico
  - Mystical Marriage of St Catherine of Alexandria (1609)
- Casa Mensini:
  - Four Evangelists (1619), fresco
  - Glory and Triumph of Saint Lucia (1612), fresco
- Church of San Pietro a Ovile:
  - Famiglie di Gesù e di San Giovannino (1614)
- Church of San Raimondo al Refugio:
  - Gesù restituisce l’abito del povero a Santa Caterina
  - St Catherine of Siena gives her coat to the poor
- San Sebastiano:
  - Glory of St. Sebastian with Virtue and Angels (1606)
- Convent of Santa Marta:
  - Santa Cecilia che suona (1615), in collaboration with Pietro Sorri
- Convento delle Sperandie (Monastero delle Trafisse):
  - Immacolata e santi (1605)
  - Adoration of the Shepherds (1605), fresco
  - Annunciation (1605), fresco
  - Visitation (1605), fresco
- Sant'Anna in Sant'Onofrio
  - Morte di Sant'Onofrio (Death of Saint Arnulf)
- Palazzo Piccolomini alla Postierla (Quattro Cantoni):
  - Vision of St Sabinus (c. 1617)
- Palazzo Pubblico
  - Emperor Charles V Renewing the University Privileges in Siena (Council Hall, v. 1598)
  - Virgin in Glory (new council hall)
  - Madonna and child with Angels (third hall)
  - Madonna of the Rosary (third hall, v. 1606)
  - Martyrdom of St Sebastian (third hall, v. 1606)
- Pinacoteca Nazionale di Siena:
  - Madonna and child with St Savino (1612), 35th hall
- Santa Caterina Sanctuary, Oratorio della Tintoria, frescoes (1607)
  - Mission of Catherine to Pope Gregory XI at Avignon
  - Catherine brings about Reconciliation with Florentines
  - Return of Catherine to Florence
- Santa Maria della Scala:
  - St Caterina da Siena (c. 1610)

=== In other places ===
- Pietà e Santi, Santa Croce church, Abbadia San Salvatore
- Madonna col Bambino che consegna le chiavi a San Pietro, San Biagio church, Castiglione d'Orcia
- Annunciazione (Annunciation), Lucignano Communal Museum, first hall, Lucignano
- Martirio di Santa Caterina d’Alessandria (Martyr of St. Catherine of Alexandria), Santa Caterina delle Ruote (1607), Radicondoli
