= Santo Spirito, Siena =

Roman Catholic church in Siena, Italy

Coordinates: 43.3180°N 11.3375°E

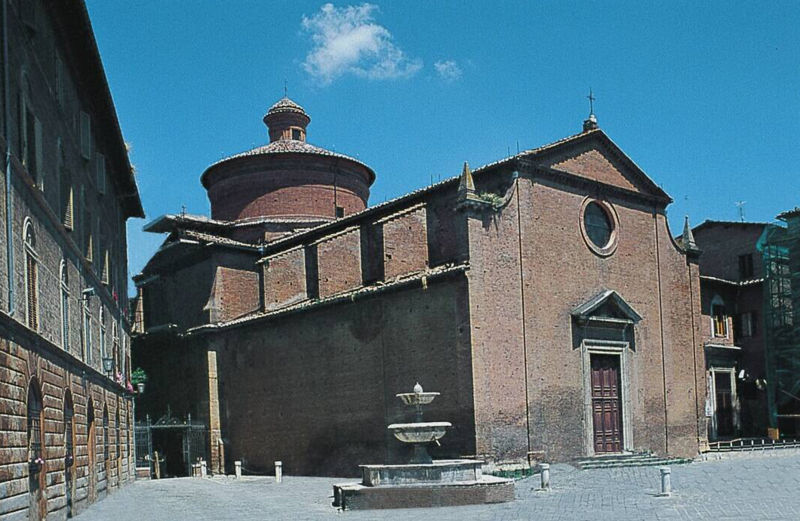
Santo Spirito

Santo Spirito is a Renaissance style, Roman Catholic church located in piazza Santo Spirito, where Via dei Pispini meets Vicolo del Sasso, in Siena, Italy.

== History ==
Building at the site was begun by the Biccherna for monks of the Silvestrine order in 1345. In 1440 it was passed to the Benedictines of Santa Giustina, and soon after to the Dominican Order. They held the monastery till their suppression in 1782. The Benedictines were the first to erect a library.

The church is largely a reconstruction from 1498-1504; the architectural design is attributed to Francesco di Giorgio, and Pandolfo Petrucci. The cupola was completed in 1504, but the church was not consecrated till 1513.

The marble portal (1519) was designed by Baldassare Peruzzi. The interior houses the funeral monument of a number of Spaniards, including Daniel Burgos, Ferdinando Alvarez, Pietro Crispo Spagnuoli, and a chapel (Cappella degli Spagnoli) which is one of Sodoma's masterpieces. The chapel was painted (1530) in Renaissance style with tromp-d'oeil and architecture, and includes frescoes of Saints James (Patron of Spain), Anthony, and Sebastian; a canvas of the Virgin and Saints. Astolfo Petrazzi painted a San Francesco di Paola. The statue of St Vincent Ferrer is by Giacomo Cozzarelli (1453 – 1515).

Other works in the church include a Jesus at Gesthemane, a Deposition, and a St Vincent by Giovanni Paolo Pisani. The main altar has a St Hyacinth (1600) painted by Francesco Vanni, while the four episodes of the Life of the Saint were painted by Ventura Salimbeni. The church once held the relics of Santa Orsina, once in the suppressed Monastery of Vita Eterna. The four saints painted alongside the main altar were painted by Rutilio Manetti. The Tribune of the Choir has a Descent of the Holy Spirit (1703) by Giuseppe Nicola Nasini. The church also has a terracotta nativity scene or presepe by Ambrogio della Robbia.

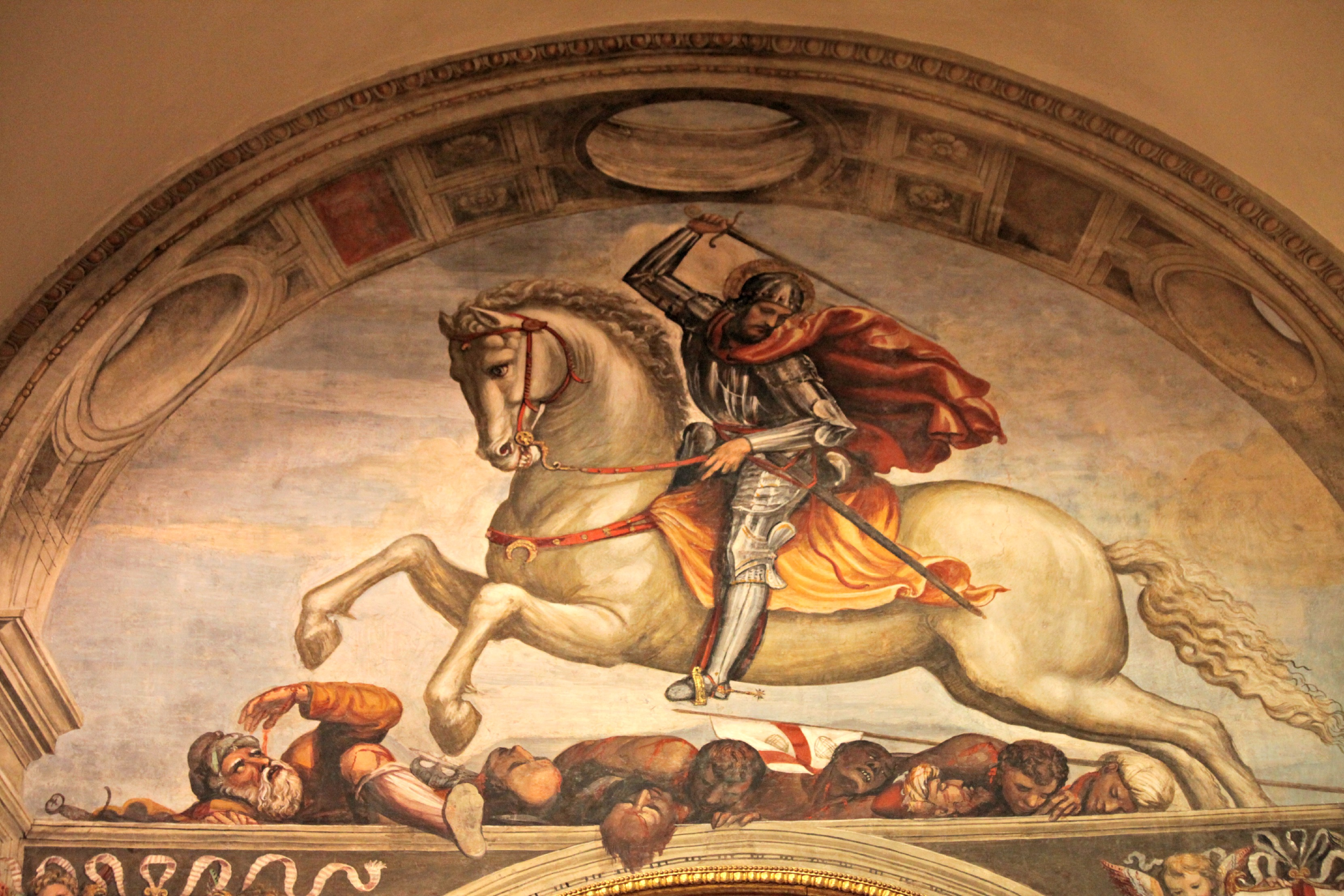
St James smites the Moors by Sodoma in Cappella degli Spagnoli.

In the sacristy, located where once was the cloister, is a 1516 fresco by Fra Paolo da Pistoia.
