= Santa Marta, Siena =

Church and Monastery in Siena, Italy

Coordinates: 43.312423°N 11.326458°E

Santa Marta is a former Roman Catholic convent and church of located in the city of Siena, region of Tuscany, Italy. It now serves in part as historic archive for Siena. It is located about 30 meters downhill of the Cappella del Rosario on Via San Marco and 30 meters uphill of Porta San Marco.

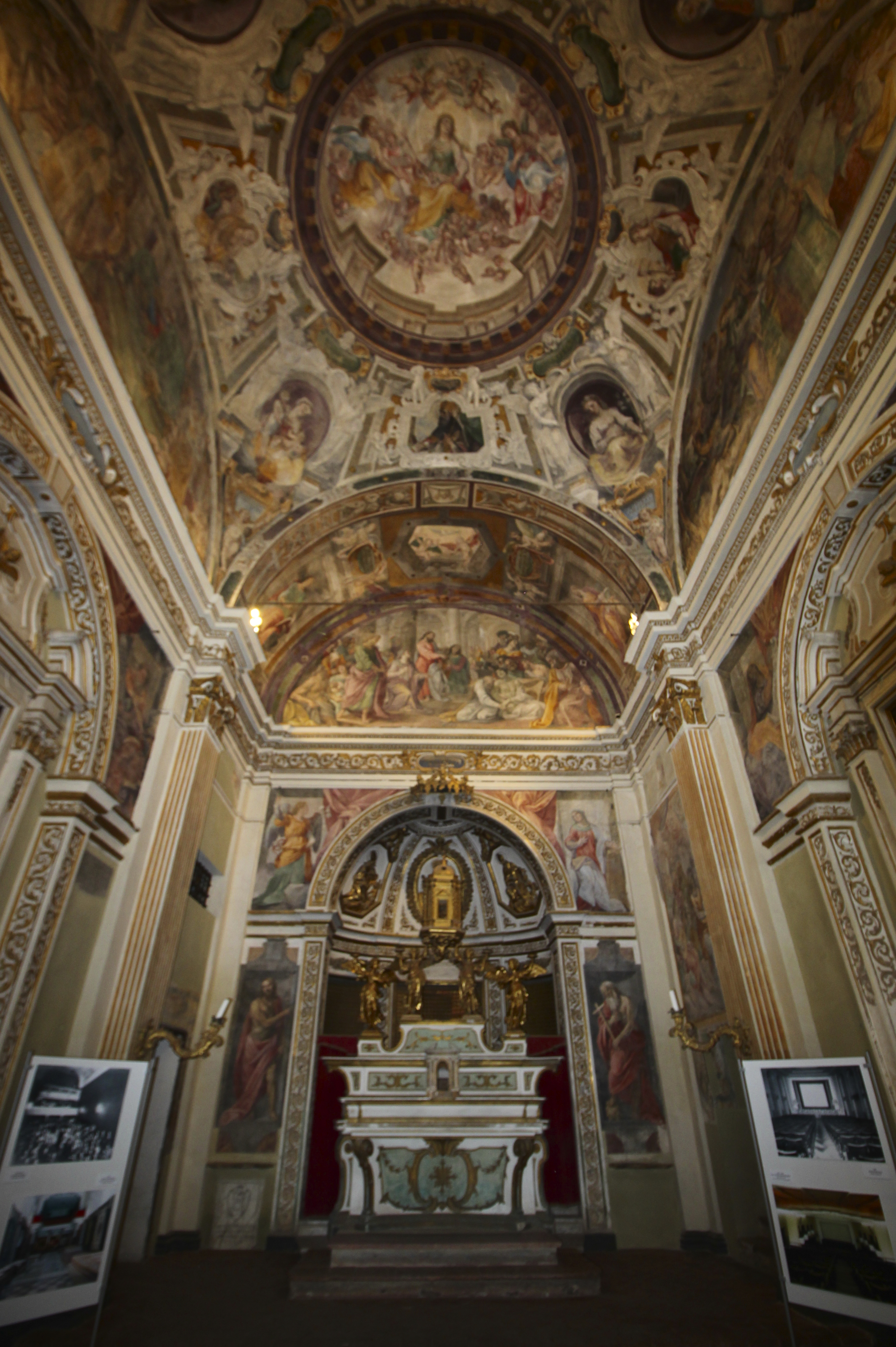
Interior of the church of Santa Marta

== History ==
A cloistered Augustinian convent for nuns was founded in 1328 by an aristocratic widow, named Milla de’ Conti d’Elci, who endowed the convent with her properties. It is dedicated to St Martha of Bethany.

The convent was restructured in the early 16th-century with a new Renaissance style, brick church facade (circa 1501), sober and with two empty niches, designed by Antonio Maria Lari (il Tozzo), and decorations of the church by Sebastiano Folli and Pietro Sorri. Folli painted the Resurrection of Lazarus on the ceiling. In 1840, the church still possessed paintings by Rutilio Manetti.

In 1810, the monastery was suppressed by the Napoleonic government. Initially used as a Casa di Forza (jail), after 1816 until 1975, it served as an orphanage. The commune now uses the monastery for historical archives.

The cloister still possesses monochrome 14th-century frescoes attributed to either Gualtieri di Giovanni (circa 1370-1445) or Benedetto di Bindi. Other lunettes in the complex have medieval frescoes that depict monastic life; some of these frescoes have only been recovered with restorations in the late 20th century. In the choir some frescoes depict the life of St Martha, painted by followers of either Simone Martini or Matteo Giovannetti. Other frescoes in the church depict local beatified monks including, Andrea Gallerani, either Pietro Pettinaio or Niccolatio Bandinelli. Some represent events in the history of the monastic orders and the founders, attributed to Martino di Bartolomeo and date to 1389-1435. The refectory frescoes were under restoration in 2006.
