= Astolfo Petrazzi =

Italian painter

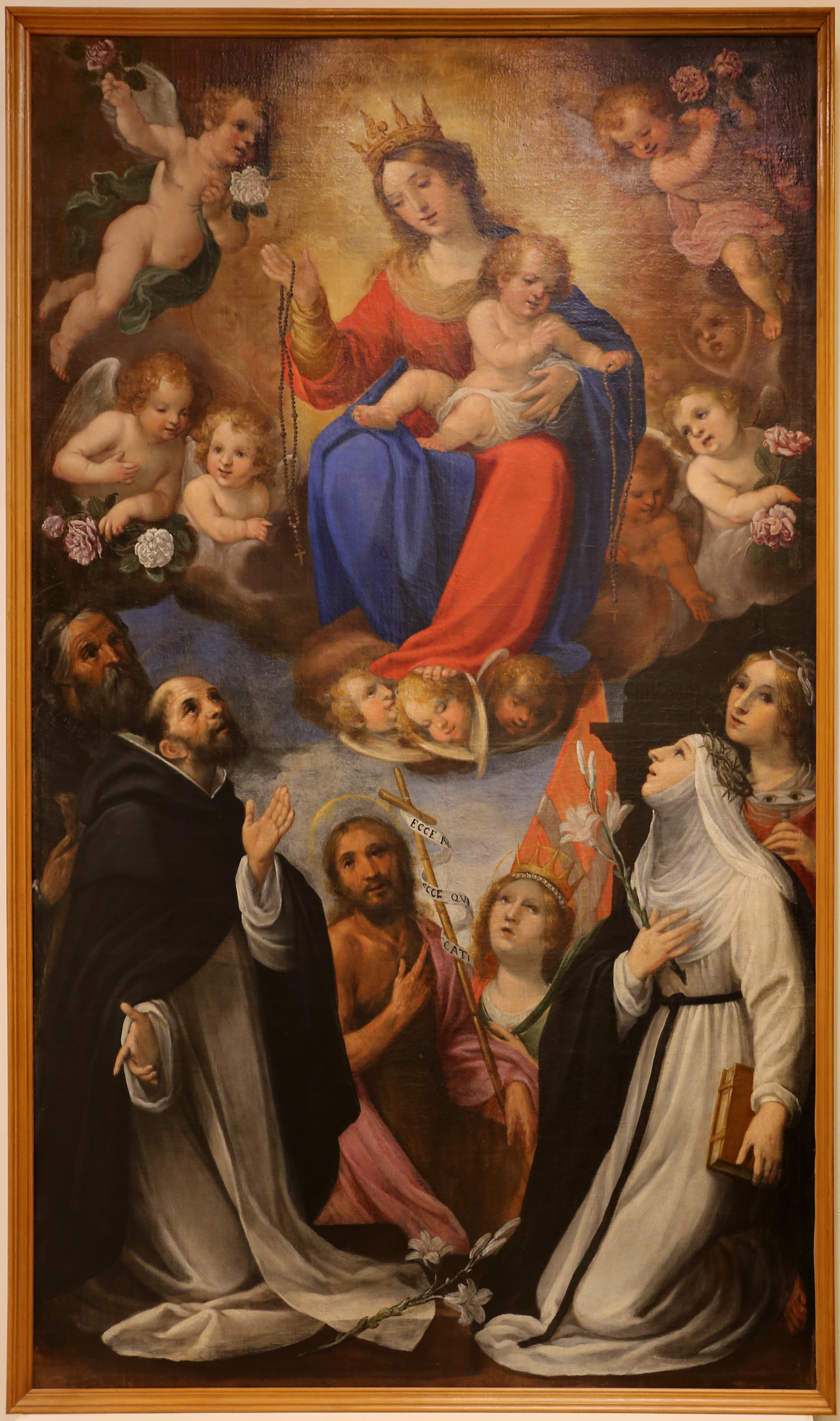
Madonna del rosario con santi e beati, San Lorenzo a Serravalle, Buonconvento

Astolfo Petrazzi (1583–1665) was an Italian painter of the Baroque period, active mainly in his hometown of Siena, but also Spoleto and Rome. He was a pupil of mainly Francesco Vanni, but also worked under Ventura Salimbeni and Pietro Sorri.

== Biography ==
=== Early life and education ===
Petrazzi's art was entirely rooted in the artistic traditions of Siena. The influence of the Late Mannerist art of Francesco Vanni and Ventura Salimbeni is evident in the angular drapery and swift flickering colour of such early works as St. Francis Receiving the Stigmata (early 1600s; Siena, Palazzo Chigi-Saracini), while the sweetness of expression and domestic mood of the Virgin with Child and St. Catherine of Siena (Siena, Palazzo Chigi-Saracini) reveal his debt to the art of Alessandro Casolani and Vincenzo Rustici.

=== Mature career ===
Between 1610 and 1620 Petrazzi developed a new style, derived both from the Caravaggesque naturalism of Rutilio di Lorenzo Manetti and Francesco Rustici, and from the clear and direct realism of Cigoli and Matteo Rosselli. Rosselli’s paintings also inspired the warm Venetian palette and meticulous rendering of precious fabrics, evident in such works as the Adoration of the Magi (Siena, San Sebastiano in Vallepiatta).

In the 1620s Petrazzi went to Rome, where he responded to the classical trends in contemporary Roman painting. This is apparent in the paintings he produced after his return to Siena c. 1624–5: for example the Last Communion of St. Jerome (1631; Siena, Sant'Agostino) – his first documented work – and the Young John the Baptist Comforted by Angels (1639; San Giovannino della Staffa, Siena), both of which suggest the influences of Domenichino and Guido Reni.

=== Later work ===
Petrazzi’s late works, though copious, are marred by a remarkable repetitiousness of types and compositions and by a progressive decline in quality. Those of the 1640s include the Martyrdrom of St. Bartholomew (1644; Ancaiano parish church).

Petrazzi also painted still-lifes (e.g. Kitchen Maid with Game and Fruits, Siena, priv. col.) and genre scenes (e.g. the Butcher’s Shop; Siena, Col. Palazzo Chigi-Saracini), and presided over a drawing school for students in his home.

== Works ==
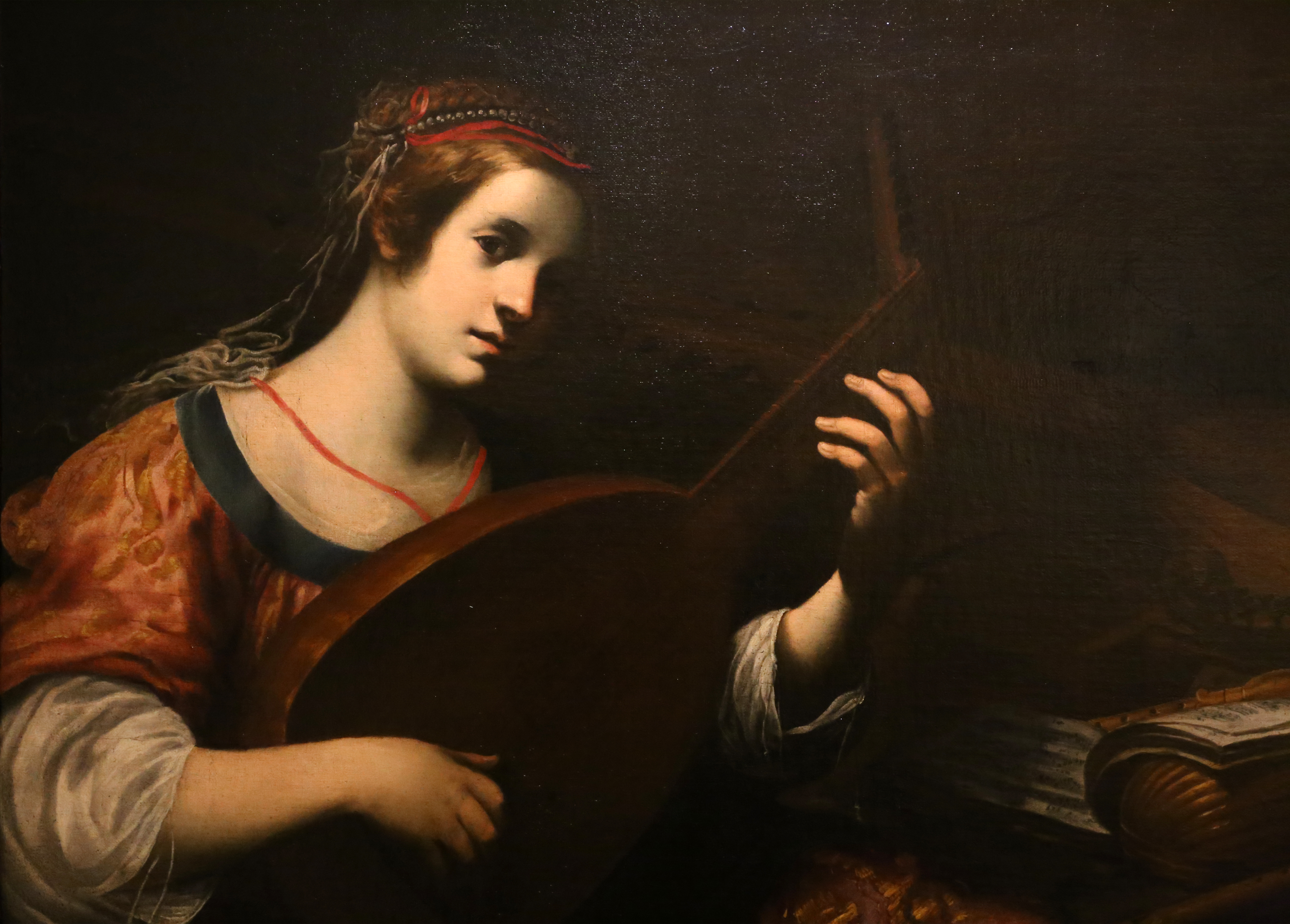
Suonatrice di liuto con strumenti musicali (Siena, Pinacoteca)

- Ascension (Ascensione), Museo dell'Opera del Duomo, Siena Cathedral
- Communion of San Girolamo, Sant'Agostino, Siena
- Conversion of St Paul, Chiesa della Carceri di Sant'Ansano, Siena
- Christian Bishop of Magonza concede a Siena alcune franchigie per conto del Barbarossa (1627), Palazzo Pubblico, Siena
- Eternal Father and Saints John, Hippolyte and Bernard, Basilica di San Francesco, Siena
- Immaculate Conception, Chiesa e Convento di Sant'Agostino, Pietrasanta
- La Madonna and the Plague of Siena, San Clemente in Basilica of Santa Maria dei Servi, Siena
- La Pietà and Saints Giovanni Evangelista, Bernardino e Tommaso, Santa Maria della Scala, Sala di San Pio (St. Pius Hall), Siena
- Lady and St John the Baptist (1644), Santi Simone e Giuda Collegiate, Radicondoli
- Madonna del Rosario with the Blessed Franco da Grotti and Saints Domenico, Giovanni Battista, Orsola, Caterina da Siena, Lucia, Museo d'Arte Sacra della Val d'Arbia, ("museum of religious art of the Val d'Arbia"), Buonconvento
- Martyrdom of Saint Bartholomgew (1644), San Bartolomeo ad Ancaiano, Sovicille
- Martyrdom of Saint Crescentius (1639), Palazzo Pubblico, Siena
- Martyrdom of Saint Sebastian, fresco in San Sebastiano in Valle Piatta, Siena
- Miracle of St Cerbo, Museo delle Biccherne, Siena City Archives
- Return of the Prodigal Son, Palazzo Chigi-Piccolomini alla Postierla, Siena
- St Giacomo restores vision to a blind man, Questura, Siena
- St Joseph in Glory (1639), Palazzo Pubblico, Siena
- St Sebastian, Scarlatti Hall, Palazzo Chigi-Saracini, Siena
- Santa Caterina che dà la veste al povero, Chiesa della Compagnia di Santa Caterina della Misericordia, Serre di Rapolano
- Santa Caterina receives the heart of Christ Redeemer, Chiesa della Compagnia di Santa Caterina della Misericordia, Rapolano Serre, Rapolano Terme
- Santi Biagio, Domenico, Caterina da Siena e Sebastiano in adorazione della Madonna col Bambino, Chiesa di San Fortunato a Murlo im Castello/Borgo Murlo, Murlo
- Lute player, Pinacoteca Nazionale di Siena
- Glory of San Giobbe (1648), Oratorio di San Rocco, Siena, worked with Francesco Bertini
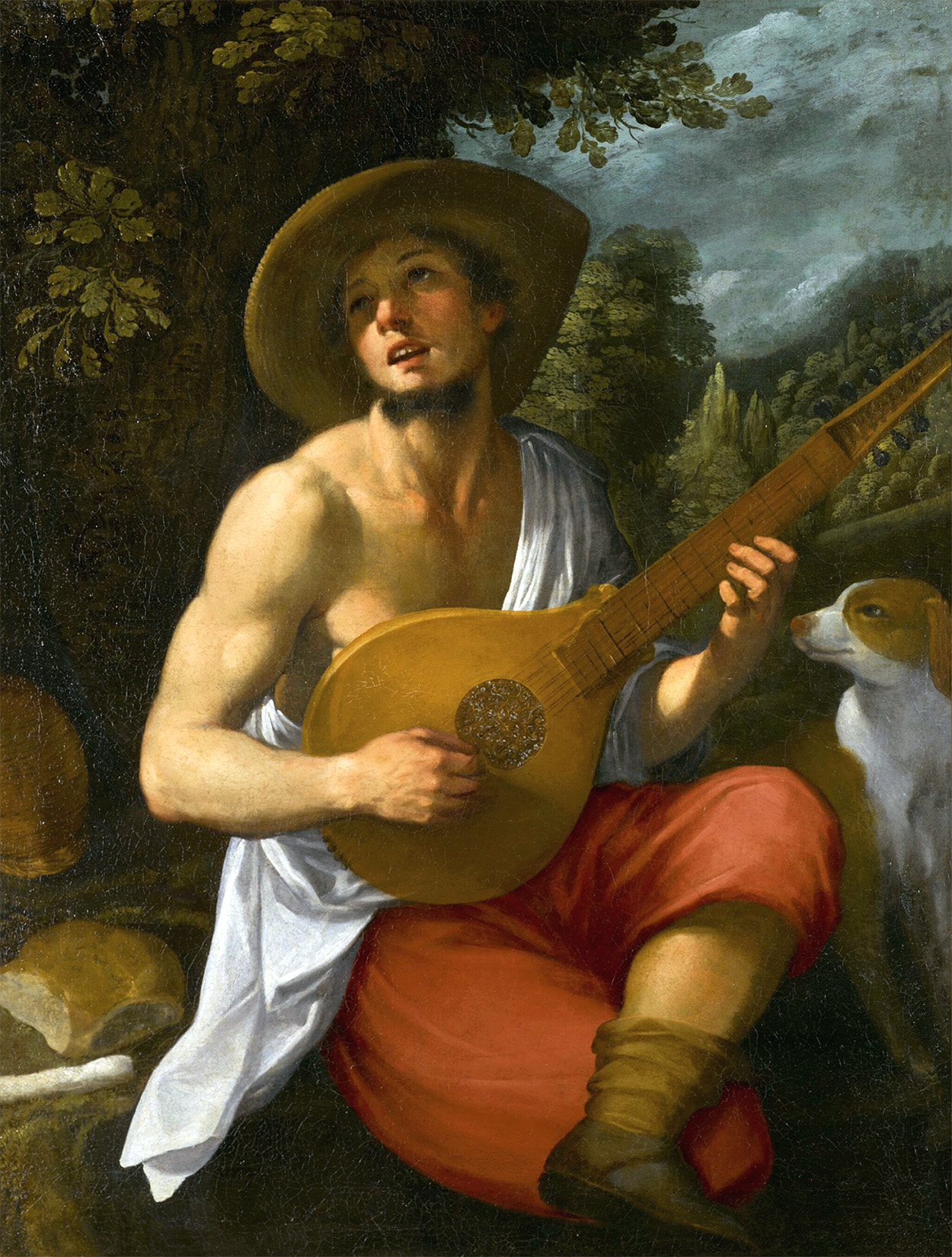
Shepherd playing the cetera

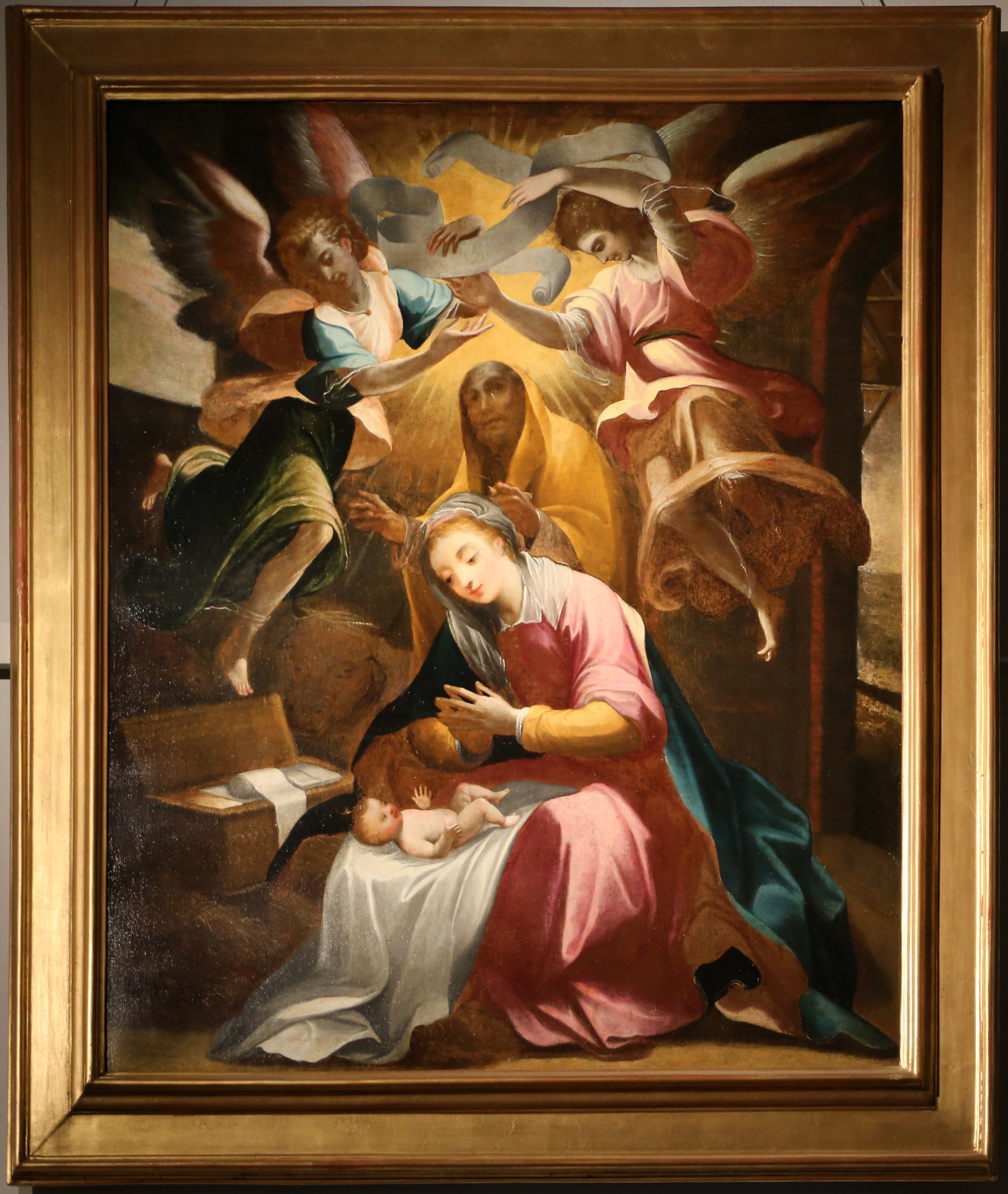
Natività con gloria d'angeli, Musée Fesch, Ajaccio

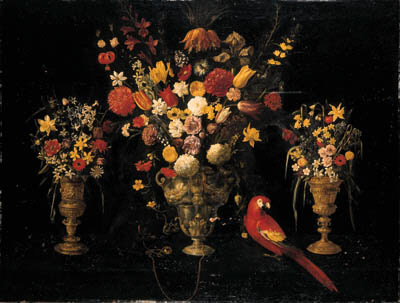
Still Life with Flowers and Parrot

== Bibliography ==
- Baldinucci, Filippo (1728). Notizie de' Professori del Disegno, Da Cimabue in qua, Secolo V. dal 1610. al 1670. Distinto in Decennali [Notice of the Professors of Design, from Cimabue to now, from 1610-1670]. Florence: Stamperia S.A.R. per li Tartini, e Franchi. pp. 85–86.
- Torriati, Piero (2004). Tutta Siena. Contrada per Contrada. Florence: Edizioni Bonechi. ISBN 88-7204-456-1.
