= Santi Niccolo e Lucia, Siena =

Church in Tuscany, Italy

Coordinates: 43.315212°N 11.327821°E

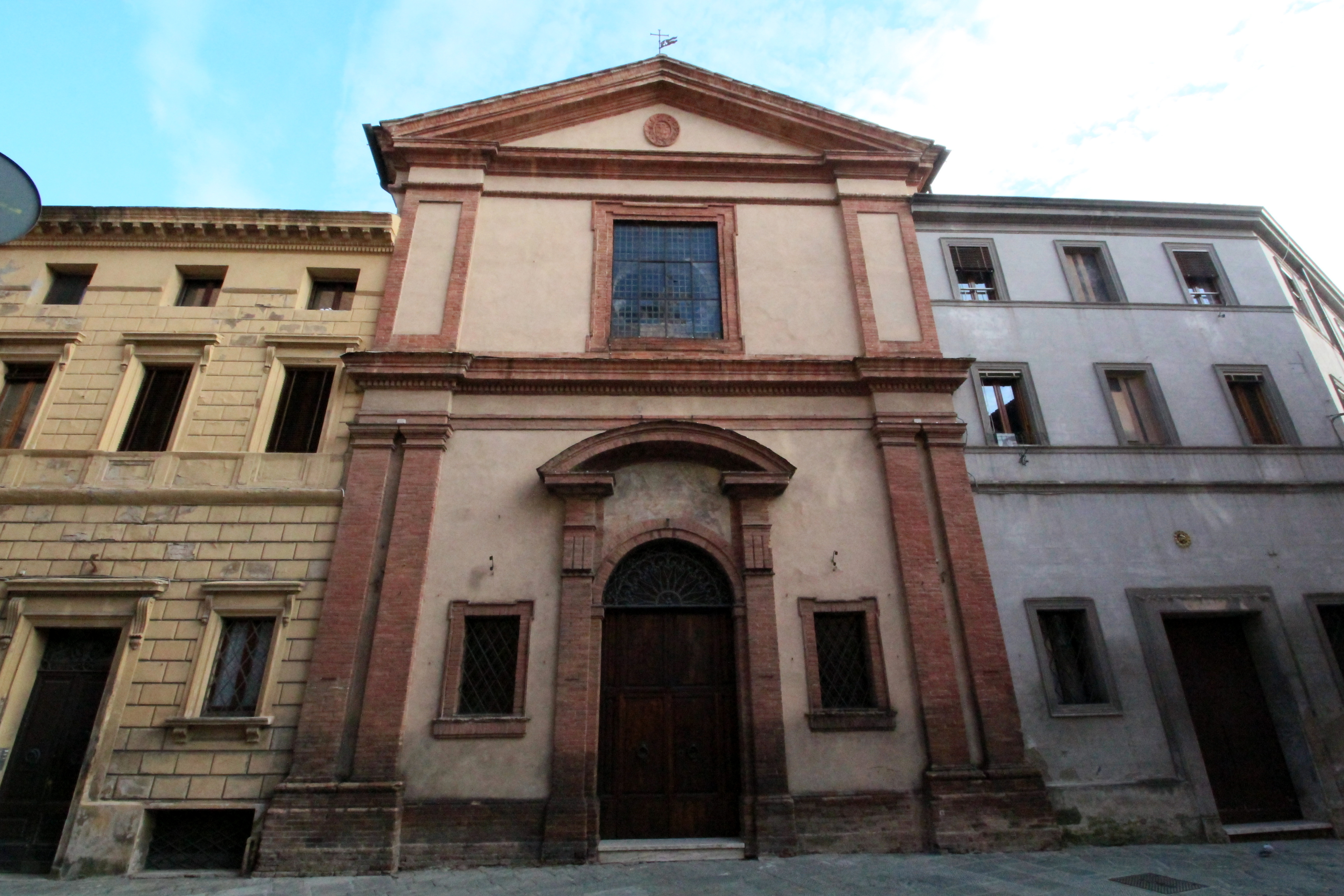
The church of Santi Niccolo e Lucia

Santi Niccolò e Lucia, also known only as Santa Lucia, is a Roman Catholic church located in Pian dei Mantellini, in the city of Siena, region of Tuscany, Italy.

== History ==
A parish church dedicated to the two saints, Niccolò and Lucia, was present at the site for centuries when it was rebuilt in the late 16th and early 17th century.

The ceilings and vaults of the church were frescoed by Sebastiano Folli with the Glory of Santa Lucia (1612) and Glory of St John the Evangelist (1621). The main altarpiece depicts the Martyrdom of St Lucy (1606) painted by Francesco Vanni. Flanking the altar are polychrome wooden statues from the Quattrocento depicting the titular saints. The Lucy is attributed to Giacomo Cozzarelli, while the Niccolo is from the school of Giovanni di Stefano.

On the left wall, is a Crucifixion by the son of Ventura Salimbeni, Simondio Salimbeni. One of the side altars has stuccoes by Giuseppe Silini, with formerly a fresco by Simone Martini taken from Porta Camollia.
