= Andrea Lucchesi =

Italian composer

Andrea Luca Lucchesi (also spelled Luchesi; 23 May 1741 – 21 March 1801) was an Italian composer. He knew both Mozart and Beethoven.

== Biography ==
Andrea Lucchesi was born at Motta di Livenza, near Treviso the eleventh child of Pietro Luchese and Caterina Gottardi. The rather wealthy family descended from groups of noble families who had moved from Lucca to Venice in the 14th century (hence the name Luchese; from 1764/65 Andrea began to use the name Luchesi, which we can find written by his contemporaries also as Lucchesi, Lughesi, Luckesi, Lucchezzy, etc.). He grew up in his native town, receiving musical and general education from his elder brother Matteo, a priest, public tutor and organist.

By 1757 he moved to Venice. The protection of the nobleman Jseppo Morosini enabled him to study with eminent musicians: Gioacchino Cocchi, Padre Paolucci, Giuseppe Saratelli, Domenico Gallo, Ferdinando Bertoni and (the best-known of them) Baldassare Galuppi. His career in Venice developed quickly: examiner of the organists commission in 1761, then organist at San Salvatore (1764), composer of works for "organ or cembalo", instrumental, sacred and theatre music. He composed for official celebrations, the last (1771) being the solemn funeral of the Duke of Montealegre, Spanish ambassador to Venice. As a famous virtuoso he was invited to play organ in and outside Venice, e.g. was in charge of inaugurating the new organ of the basilica of Saint Anthony in Padua.

In the spring of 1765 his opera L'isola della fortuna was performed at the Hoftheater in Vienna.

While on tour in Italy in 1771, Leopold and Wolfgang Mozart met Andrea Lucchesi and received one of his concertos for cembalo (Wolfgang was still playing the concerto in 1777, while Leopold and Nannerl often used the concerto for teaching and practising purposes).

At the end of 1771, Lucchesi traveled to Bonn on a three-year contract, invited by the Prince Elector Archbishop of Cologne Maximilian Friedrich von Königsegg-Rothenfels, who wished to raise the quality level of his court orchestra. After the death of the previous Kapellmeister (Ludwig van Beethoven senior, i.e. the grandfather of Beethoven), Andrea Lucchesi was nominated official court Kapellmeister in 1774.

He acquired the principality's citizenship and in 1775 married Anthonetta Josepha d'Anthoin, daughter of Maximilian Friederich's senior counselor. With the exception of a visit to Venice in 1783-84, he lived in Bonn until his death in 1801, although his role as Kapellmeister ended in 1794, when the French invasion troops suppressed the court.

The young Beethoven was at the court chapel from 1781 to 1792 as assistant organist, cembalo and viola player. Although Beethoven's musical and compositional training was probably influenced by Lucchesi's presence, we have no evidence of any formal pupil/teacher relationship between the two. When the court organist Christian Gottlob Neefe temporarily replaced the Kapellmeister as conductor and teacher during his 1783-84 absence, Lucchesi assigned the organ service to the very young Beethoven. There is also no evidence of Lucchesi's having taught other young Bonn musicians who went on to international renown: Antonin Reicha, Bernhard and Andreas Romberg, and Ferdinand Ries.

He had one daughter, who lived in Bonn till her death, and four sons. According to Neefe the first two sons (Maximilian Friederich, born 11 December 1775, and M. Jakob Ferdinand, born 18 December 1777) were gifted musicians. Lucchesi died on 21 March 1801 at the age of 59 in Bonn.

== Works ==
- L’isola della fortuna, opera buffa with libretto by Giovanni Bertati, performed at the Hoftheater, Vienna, in 1765; also in Venice (1765) and at the Royal Theater in Lisbon (1767).
- Ademira, opera seria, for the Ascension Day in Venice (1784), to honour the visit of king Gustavus III of Sweden
- Other operas: Il marito geloso (1766), Le donne sempre donne (1767), Il giocatore amoroso (1769), Il matrimonio per astuzia (1771), Il Natal di Giove, L’inganno scoperto ovvero il conte Caramella (1773, with libretto from Carlo Goldoni), L’amore e la misericordia guadagnano il gioco (1794).
- Oratorio Sacer trialogus (1768)
- Stabat Mater (about 1770)
- Requiem (1771) in F, for the state funeral of the duke of Montealegre in San Geremia's.
- Various masses and sacred works, including: Mass for San Lorenzo in Venice, Mass for the "Festa della concezione di Maria" in Verona, Te Deum for the Incurabili conservatory in Venice
- Passione di N.S. Gesù Cristo (1776), on a text from Metastasio (recorded cd by Tactus)
- Many organ works, including:
  - 12 sonatas known as Donelli Collection (completed by 1764), now at the Naples Conservatory
  - 6 sonatine and 8 divertimenti, now at the Library of Congress, Washington, D.C.
  - 2 sonates pour l’orgue in the 'Menus plaisirs du Roi', Paris
- Celebration music for the feast of San Rocco in Venice (1769)
- Serenata for the duke of Brunswick (1764)
- Cantata for the duke of Württemberg (1767)
- 2 Symphonies (by 1768)
- 6 Sonatas 'per il cembalo con l’accompagnamento di un violino' Op.1 (Bonn, 1772)
- Sonata in fa ‘per il cimbalo’ (1771-73?), now at the University of Münster
- 3 Symphonies op. 2 (Bonn,1773) - lost
- Concerto for harpsichord (Bonn,1773) – four more concertos/trios are lost
- Cantata for the election to Bishop of Archiduke Max Franz (1785 – attributed to Luchesi in the Bonn Stadtarchiv)
- Sonate facile for cembalo and violin (Leipzig, 1796)
