= San Sebastiano in Vallepiatta, Siena =

Church in Siena, Italy

Coordinates: 43.317165°N 11.3273°E

Church of San Sebastiano in Vallepiatta
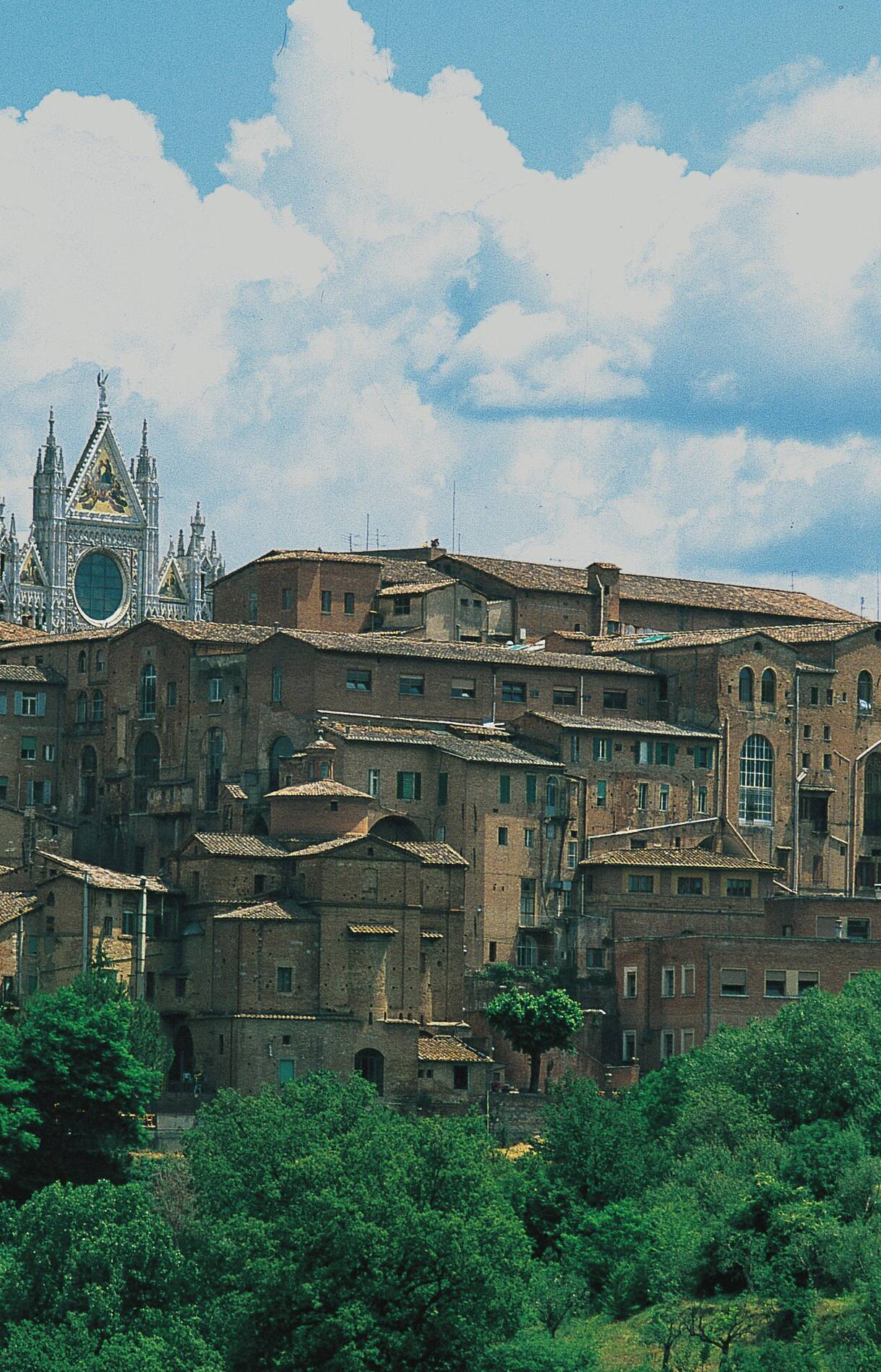
- Rear of church is found below the cathedral at right.

Religion
- Affiliation: Roman Catholic
- Province: Siena, Italy

Location
- Location: Siena, Italy
- Interactive map of Church of San Sebastiano in Vallepiatta

Architecture
- Style: Renaissance, Baroque
- Groundbreaking: 1493
- Completed: 17th century

San Sebastiano in Vallepiatta is an ancient church next to Piazzeta della Selva in Siena, Italy. It is located in the Contrada della Selva.

Church construction began in 1492 and completed in 1656, under the patronage of the guild of weavers (Tessitori). The interior is frescoed by 16th century painters, depicting Dream of St Irene by Stefano Volpi, a Glory of St Sebastian and a Virtue and Angels by Sebastiano Folli, a Stories of St Sebastian by Pietro Sorri and Rutilio Manetti. On the main altar there is a Spoliation of Christ by Luigi Ademollo, and a 15th-century Crucifix, which legend holds was donated to the Compagnia di San Giovanni Battista della Morte (Company of St John the Baptist of the Death) by St Bernard himself.

Built in the shape of a Greek cross, it has a cupola with a cylindrical tambor. The design is attributed to Francesco di Giorgio Martini. Most of the brick façade has only a sliver of a cornice with architrave in travertine marble, added in 1545–1550. The interior was frescoed in the 16th century by Giovanni Paolo Pisani, Raffaello Vanni, and Astolfo Petrazzi. The main altarpiece is a bas-relief in stucco and terracotta depicting the venerated Madonna della Selva, and is attributed to Francesco di Giorgio Martini.

== Sources ==
- Rete Toscana Luoghi della Fede.
- The Medici, Michelangelo, and the Art of Late Renaissance Florence
