= Belforte, Radicondoli =

Belforte
- Frazione
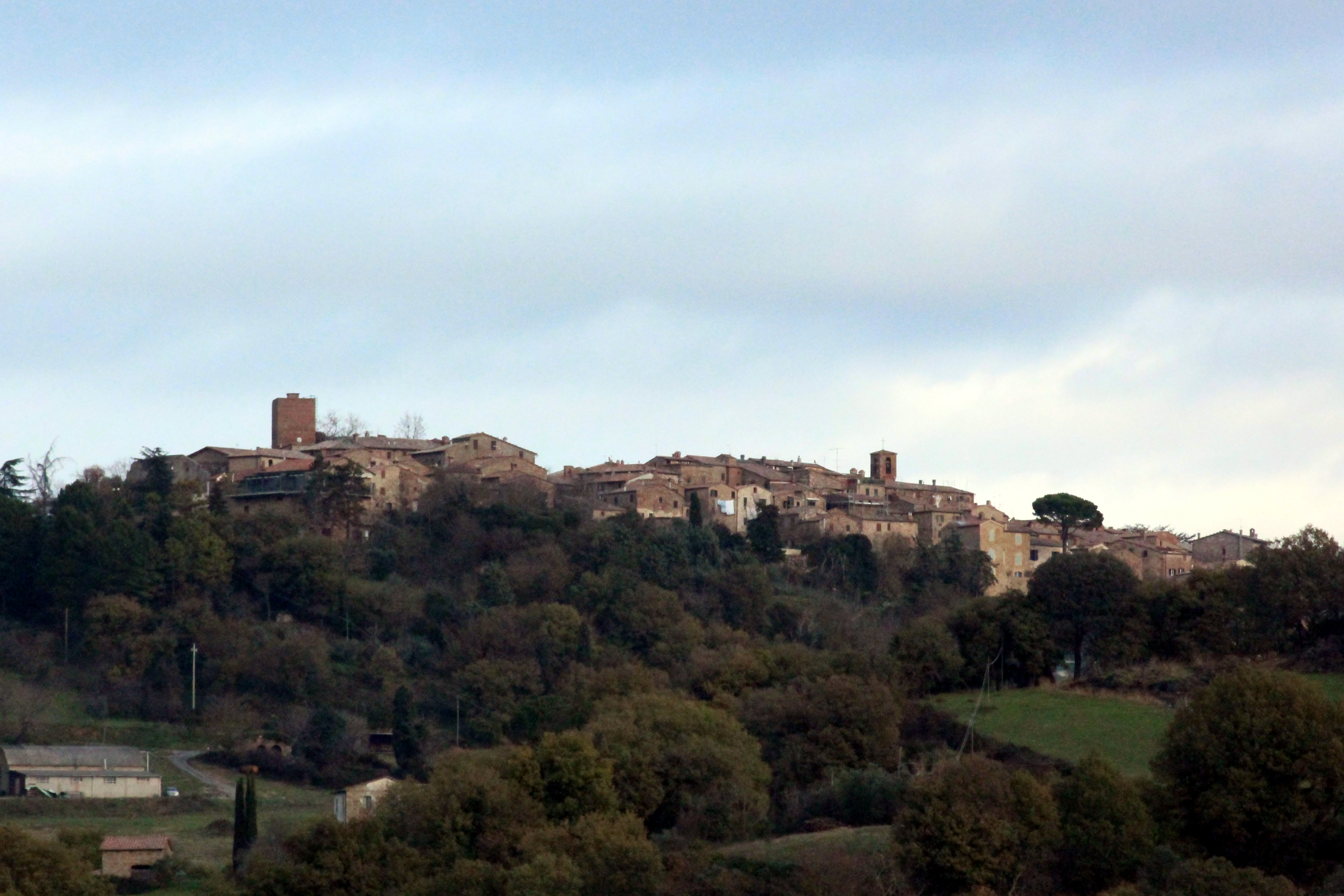
- View of Belforte

- Location of Belforte in Italy
- Coordinates: 43°13′57″N 11°3′40″E
- Country: Italy
- Region: Tuscany
- Province: Siena (SI)
- Comune: Radicondoli
- Elevation: 542 m (1,778 ft)

Population (2011)
  - Total: 194
- Time zone: UTC+1 (CET)
  - Summer (DST): UTC+2 (CEST)
- Postal code: 53030

Belforte is a village in Tuscany, central Italy, administratively a frazione of the comune of Radicondoli, province of Siena.

Belforte originated as a castle in the early medieval period, and is mentioned in a document from 1186. In 1221 it is recorded as a fief of the Counts Aldobrandeschi. Following disputes between the Aldobrandeschi and Siena, Belforte submitted to the Republic of Siena on 30 August 1301. The oldest statute of Belforte is dated 1382.

In 1833 the village of Belforte had 635 inhabitants, while at the time of the 2011 census its population was 194.
