= Giovanni Paolo Pisani =

Italian painter (1574–1637)

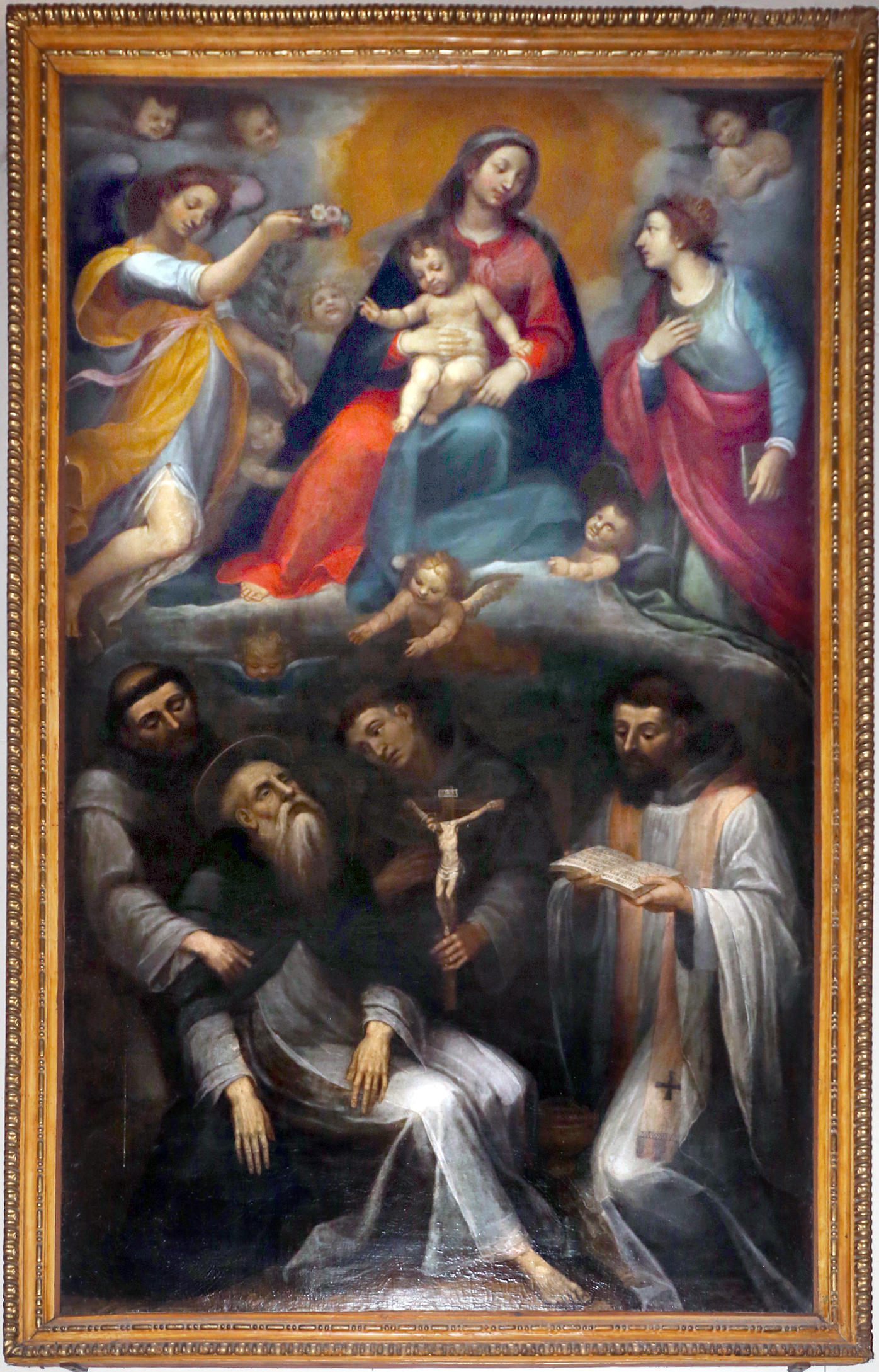
Death of Saint Anthony the Abbot, Santa Maria Assunta a Casole d'Elsa

Giovanni Paolo Pisani (1574-1637) was an Italian painter, active mainly in a Mannerist style in Siena. Paintings can be found in the churches of San Sebastiano in Vallepiatta and Santo Spirito.
