= Antonio Maria Lari =

Italian architect and painter (16th century)

Antonio Maria Lari, known as Il Tozzo (lit. 'the Squat'), was an Italian architect and painter active in Siena in the 16th century.

== Life and career ==
Born in Siena around 1503, Lari initially gained recognition as a painter of banners and flags, and became rector of the painters' guild in 1533. Influenced by Baldassarre Peruzzi, he developed architectural skills and began his career with the reconstruction of the church and convent of Santa Marta in 1535. He collaborated on notable projects, including the decoration of Porta Nuova for Emperor Charles V's visit in 1536.

Appointed chief architect of the Republic of Siena in 1537, Lari focused on fortifications and coastal towers across Tuscany, supervising works in cities like Sarteano, Sinalunga, and Orbetello. In Grosseto, he contributed to the redesign of the cathedral's interior and facade elements and restored the city walls alongside Giorgio di Pietro in 1541. Lari also worked on Maremma's defenses, including sites in Pitigliano, Talamone, and Porto Ercole, where he notably designed the Porta Nuova.

In 1546, Lari followed exiled Count Giovan Francesco Orsini to Rome, after political upheaval in Pitigliano. His last recorded mention dates to 1549, indicating he was alive but absent from Siena.

== Sources ==
- Cristina Gnoni Maravelli; Laura Martini, eds. (1996). La cattedrale di San Lorenzo a Grosseto. Arte e storia dal XIII al XIX secolo. Milano: Silvana Editoriale.
- Grasso, Monica (2004). "LARI, Antonio Maria, detto il Tozzo". Dizionario Biografico degli Italiani (in Italian). Vol. 63: Labroca–Laterza. Rome: Istituto dell'Enciclopedia Italiana. ISBN 978-88-12-00032-6.
