= Giuseppe Paolucci =

Italian composer

Giuseppe Paoloucci (May 25, 1726 – April 24, 1776) was an Italian composer, conductor and organist of Baroque music.

== Life and work ==
Giuseppe Paolucci was the only son of Domenico di Giuseppe and Anna Maria di Stefano Lucatelli. From 1729 to 1741 he was registered with his father and his second wife Francesca Soldi as a member of the Sienese parish of San Pietro a Ovile. He was educated in the convent of the monastery of San Francesco in Prato and in the monastery of Santa Croce in Florence and was a member of the Franciscan order. From March 1750 he studied counterpoint at the Convent of San Francesco in Bologna with Padre Giambattista Martini and then in 1756 became Maestro di Capella of Santa Maria Gloriosa dei Frari in Venice. He left Venice in August 1769 and in 1770 took over the work of conductor and organist at the church of San Martino in Senigallia attached to the monastery. From February 1772 until his death he was chapelmeister at the Basilica of San Francesco in Assisi.

Paolucci conducted an extensive correspondence of around 150 letters (archived in the Museo della Musica, Bologna) with Padre Martini on musical and other artistic subjects. The catalog of handwritten works by Paolucci includes more than 200 compositions of sacred music and instrumentals, which are now mainly kept in Bologna (Museo della Musica) and Assisi (Archives of the Basilica and the Convent of San Francesco). His famous treatise on counterpoint Arte pratica del contrappunto was published in 3 volumes and printed in Venice (1765 and 1772).

== Bibliography ==
- R. Morrocchi, La musica in Siena, Siena 1886, p. 117;
- L. Busi, Il padre G.B. Martini, musicista-letterato del secolo XVIII, Bologna 1891, pp. 381 s.;
- G. Radiciotti, Teatro, musica e musicisti in Sinigaglia, Milano 1893, pp. 127–129;
- F. Vatielli, Lettere di musicisti brevemente illustrate, Pesaro 1917, pp. 48–53;
- D.M. Sparacio, Musicisti minori conventuali, con più diffusa menzione di coloro che vissero dal 1700 ai giorni nostri, in Miscellanea francescana, XXV (1925), pp. 92–94;
- Assisi. La cappella della Basilica di S. Francesco. Catalogo del fondo musicale nella Biblioteca comunale di Assisi, a cura di C. Sartori, Milano 1962, ad ind.;
- G. Zanotti - M. Pollastri, Biblioteca del convento di S. Francesco di Bologna. Catalogo del fondo musicale, I-III, Bologna 1970-84, ad ind.;
- A. Sartori, Documenti per la storia della musica al Santo e nel Veneto, a cura di E. Grossato, Vicenza 1977, ad ind.;
- A. Schnoebelen, Padre Martini's collection of letters, New York 1979, pp. 452–469, nn. 3804-3948;
- G. Magrino, P. G. P.: vita e opere, tesi, Milano, Pontificio Istituto ambrosiano di Musica sacra, a.a. 1996-97;
- Catalogo del fondo musicale della Biblioteca del Sacro Convento di S. Francesco di Assisi. Fondo del maestro di cappella, a cura di F. Tuscano - F. Tuscano, Padova 1999, ad ind.;
- H. Brofsky, P., G., in The New Grove dict. of music and musicians, a cura di S. Sadie, XIX, London 2001, p. 52;
- E. Pasquini, L'«Esemplare, o sia Saggio fondamentale pratico di contrappunto». Padre Martini teorico e didatta della musica, Firenze 2004, ad ind.;
- Ead., Giambattista Martini, Palermo 2007, ad ind.;
- G. P. «Preces» a otto voci per le quarant'ore, a cura di A. Zanotelli, Padova 2008;
- E. Pasquini, Padre Martini in giudizio da Apollo, in Il Saggiatore musicale, XVI (2009), pp. 185–202;
- F. Tuscano - F. Tuscano, Fonti per la storia della cappella musicale del Sacro Convento di Assisi, in Gli antichi strumenti della cappella musicale. Saggi e catalogo, Assisi 2013, pp. 24–27.
