= Andreas Romberg =

German violinist and composer (1767–1821)

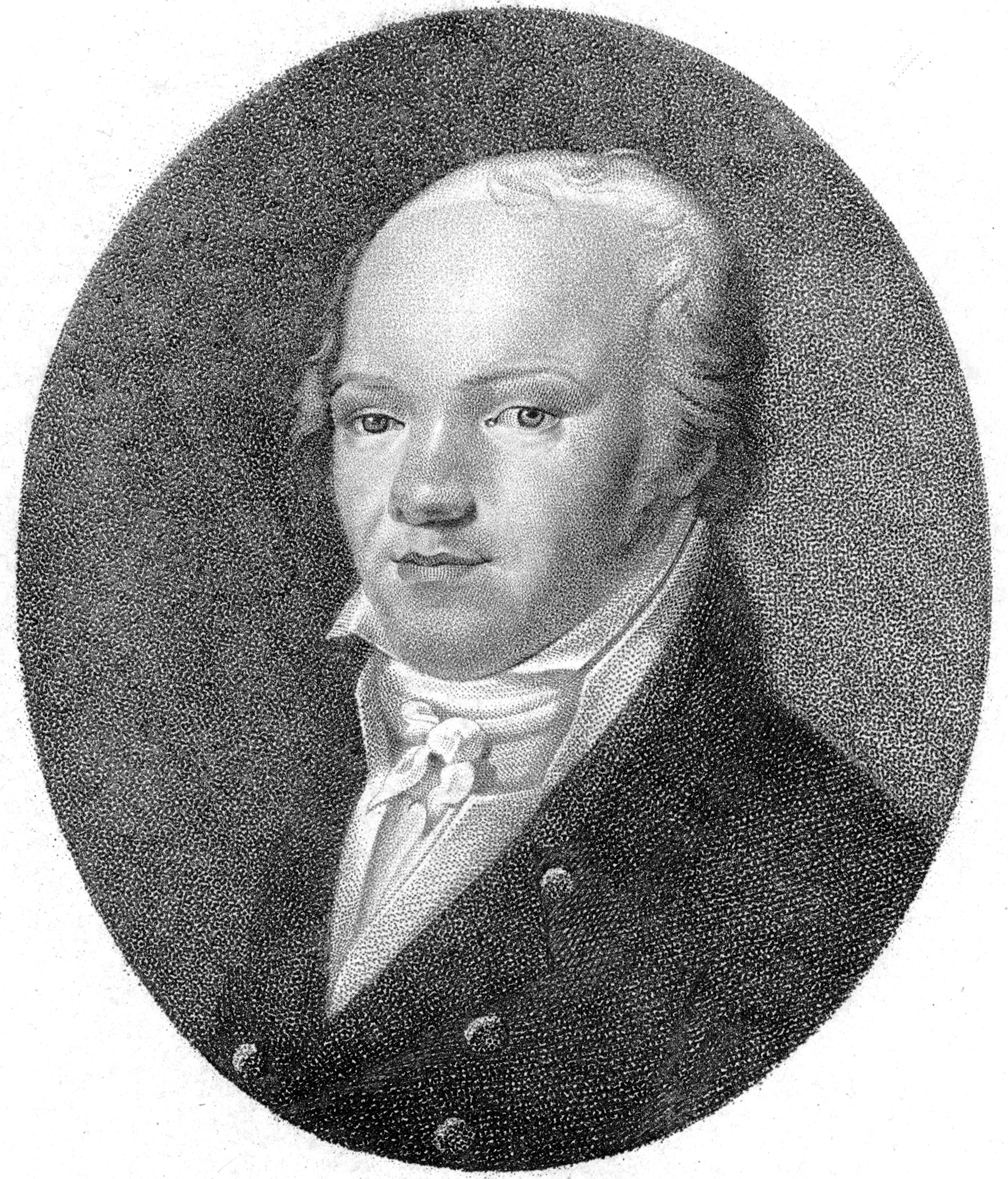

Andreas Jakob Romberg (27 April 1767 – 10 November 1821) was a German violinist and composer.

== Early life ==
Romberg was born on 27 April 1767 in Vechta, in the Duchy of Oldenburg. He learned the violin from his musician father Gerhard Heinrich Romberg and made his first debut at the age of seven with his cousin Bernhard Romberg. In addition to touring Europe, Romberg also joined the Münster Court Orchestra.

== Career ==
He joined the court orchestra of the Prince Elector in Bonn (conducted by the Kapellmeister Andrea Luchesi) in 1790, where he met the young Beethoven. He moved to Hamburg in 1793 due to wartime upheavals and joined the Hamburg Opera Orchestra. Romberg's first opera, 'Der Rabe', premiered there in 1794. He also composed his own setting of Messiah (Der Messias).

After a time in Paris, Andreas settled in Hamburg where he became a central figure in the city's musical life. In 1815 he succeeded Louis Spohr as music director at the court of the Duke, in Gotha, Thuringia. He died there on 10 November 1821.

== Selected works ==
Among his compositions are:

- String Quartets, Op. 1
- Violin Concerto No. 1 in E op. 3
- 3 Concertant Duos for 2 Violins, Op.4
- Symphony No. 1 in E flat op. 6
- Violin Concerto No. 2 in C op. 8
- Symphony No. 2 in D op. 22
- String Quintet, Op.23
- 3 String Quartets, Op.30
- Symphony No. 3 in C op. 33
- 3 Flute Quintets, Op. 41
- Was bleibet und was schwindet, Op.42
- Violin Concerto No. 3 in d minor op. 46
- Violin Concerto No. 4 in G op. 50
- Sinfonia alla turca [No. 4] in C op. 51
- Te Deum Laudamus, Op.55
- 3 Concertant Duos for 2 Violins, Op.56
- Psalmodie, Op.65
- Dixit Dominus
- 3 Violin Sonatas

== Sources ==
- Stephenson, Kurt (2001). "Romberg, Andreas Jakob". Grove Music Online.
