= Palazzo del Capitano del Popolo, Siena =

Coordinates: 43.317029°N 11.32939°E

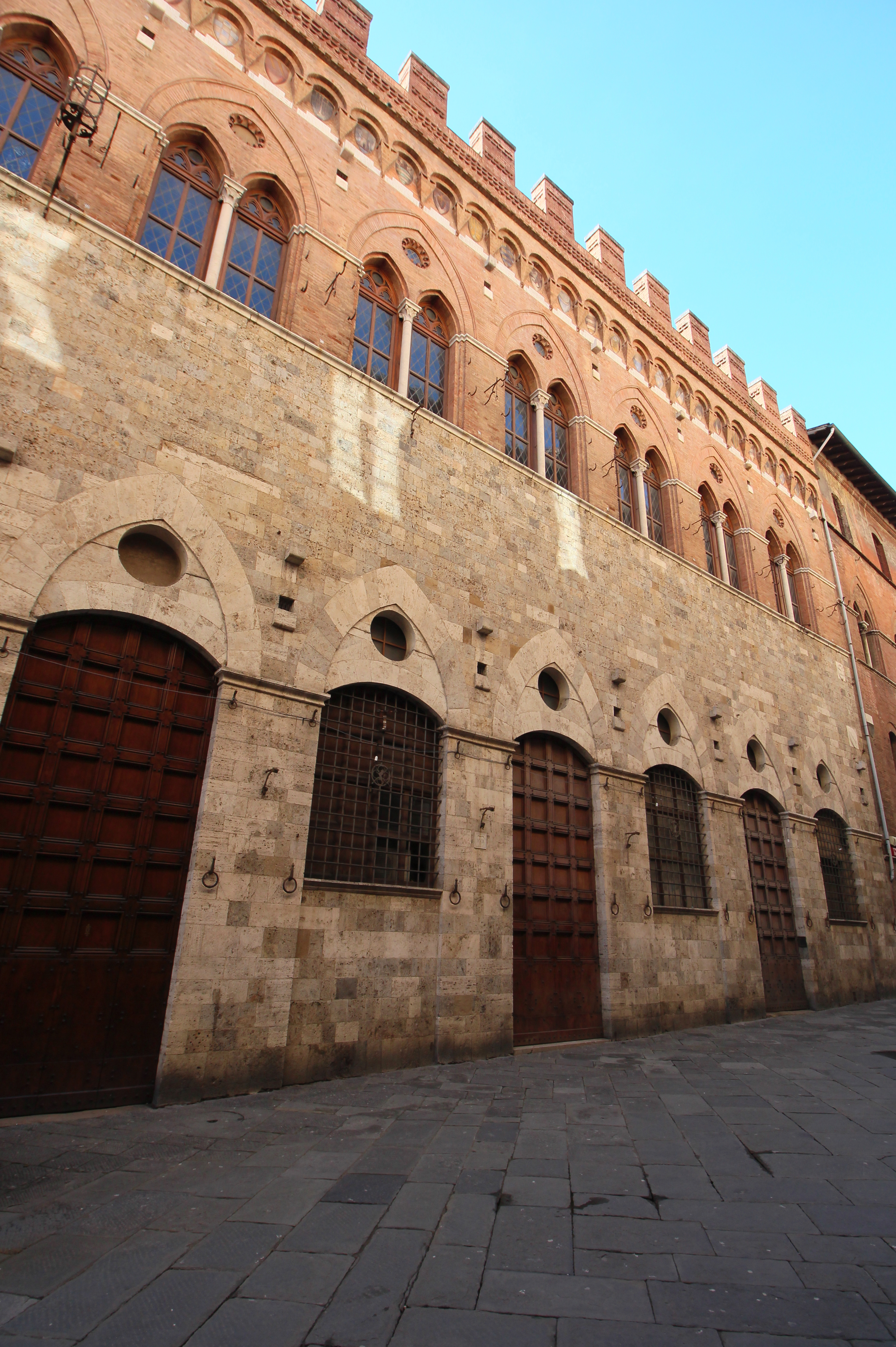
Palazzo del Capitano del Popolo, Siena

The Palazzo del Capitano del Popolo is a 13th-century Gothic style, brick and stone, urban palace located on via del Capitano, #13-19 in the city of Siena, region of Tuscany, Italy. The name derives because it was once home of the Capitano della Guerra or Capitano del Popolo, who served as the main official for the Republic. The Palazzo is just off the Piazza of the Duomo.

== History ==
The palace changed through many hands over the centuries; coats of arms on the walls include those of the Piccolomini and Bandinelli. Other names for the palace have included Petroni and Grottanelli-de' Santi. A plaque indicates palace rebuilt in 1425, by Capitano Pietro Salimbeni Benassai. In 1854 it underwent a reconstruction which, hoping to give the palace an antique look, led to addition of crenellated roofline, and rings for tying up horses. The palace is down the street from the Palazzo Chigi alla Postierla, Siena.
