= Anqua =

- Frazione
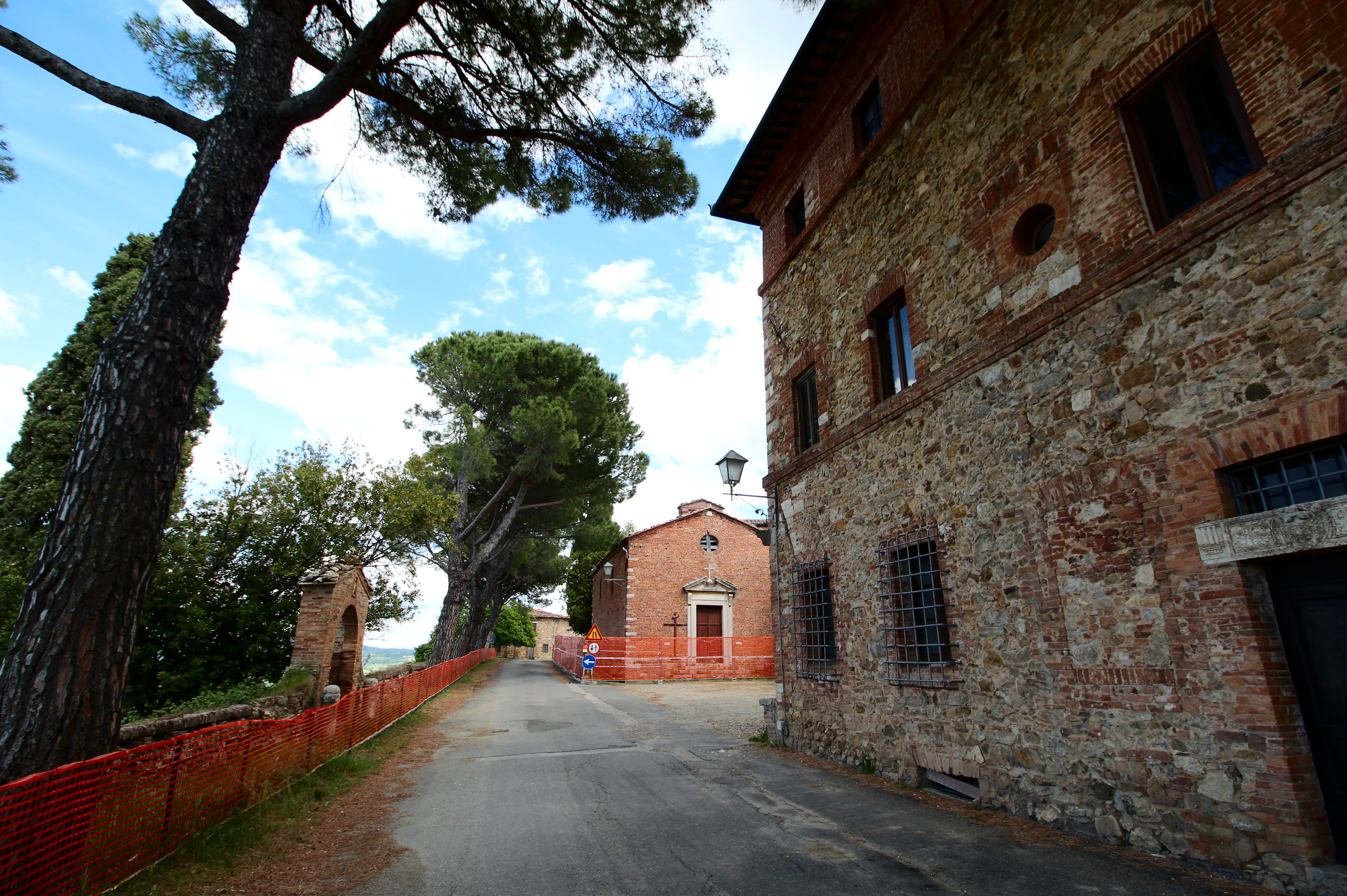

- Location of Anqua in Italy
- Coordinates: 43°12′48″N 11°59′7″E
- Country: Italy
- Region: Tuscany
- Province: Siena (SI)
- Comune: Radicondoli
- Elevation: 477 m (1,565 ft)

Population (2011)
  - Total: 6
- Demonym: Anquigiani
- Time zone: UTC+1 (CET)
  - Summer (DST): UTC+2 (CEST)

Anqua is a village in Tuscany, central Italy, administratively a frazione of the comune of Radicondoli, province of Siena. At the time of the 2001 census its population was 6.
