= Francesco di Giorgio Martini =

Italian painter

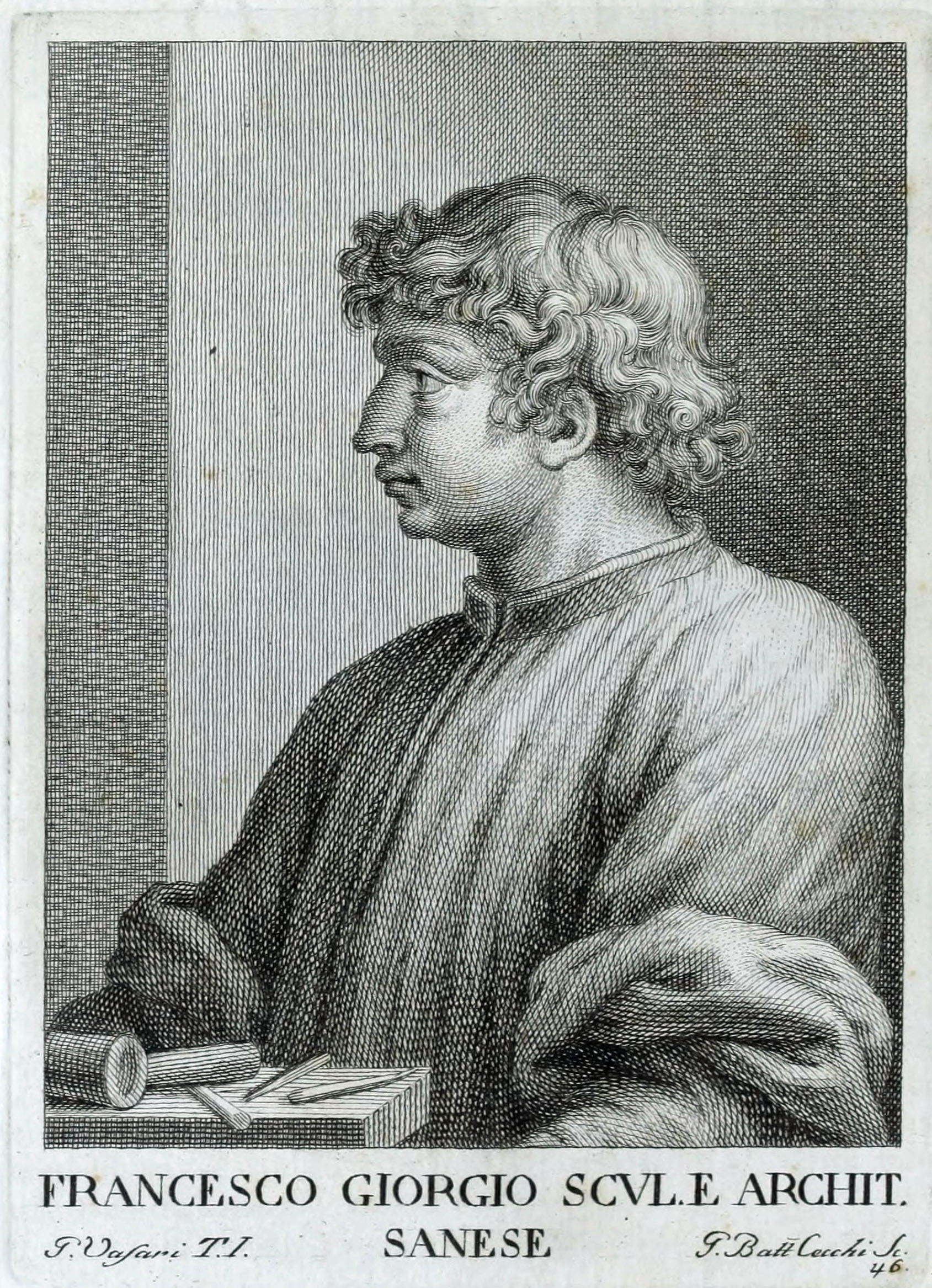
Francesco di Giorgio Martini

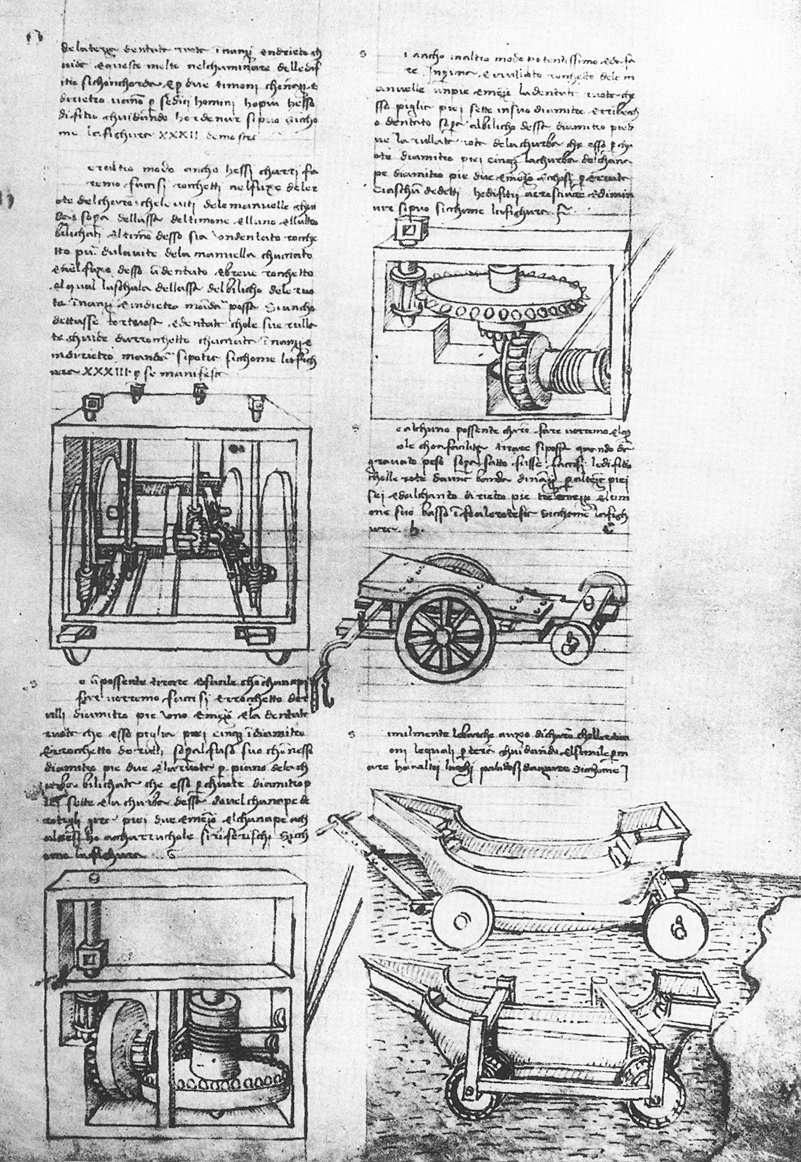
Extract from a notebook of Francesco di Giorgio Martini, 1470

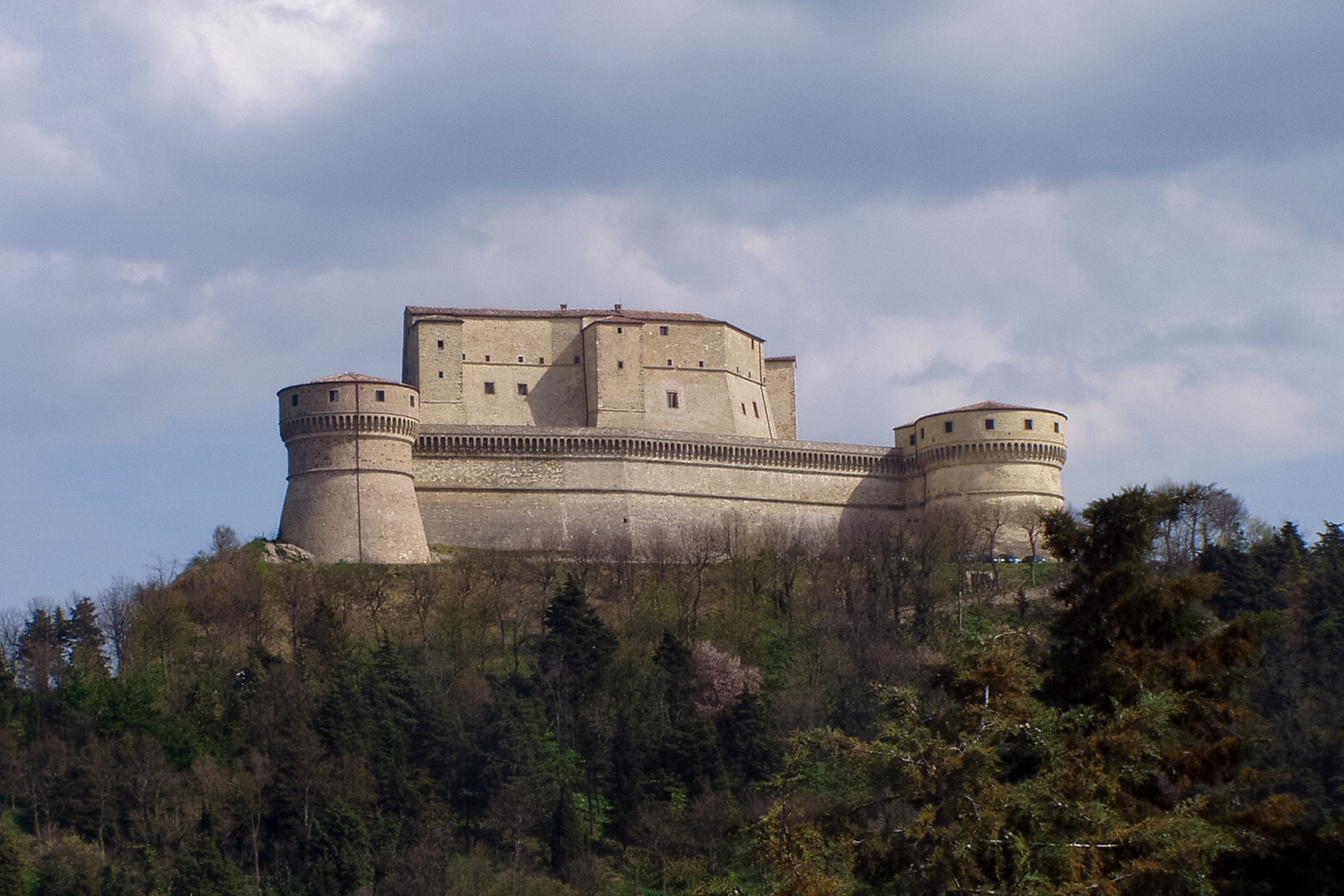
Fortress of San Leo

Francesco di Giorgio Martini (1439–1501) was an Italian architect, engineer, painter, sculptor, and writer. As a painter, he belonged to the Sienese School. He was considered a visionary architectural theorist—in Nikolaus Pevsner's terms: "one of the most interesting later Quattrocento architects". As a military engineer, he executed architectural designs and sculptural projects and built almost seventy fortifications for the Federico da Montefeltro, Count (later Duke) of Urbino, building city walls and early examples of star-shaped fortifications.

Born in Siena, he apprenticed as a painter with Vecchietta. In panels painted for cassoni he departed from the traditional representations of joyful wedding processions in frieze-like formulas to express visions of ideal, symmetrical, vast and all but empty urban spaces rendered in perspective.

He composed an architectural treatise Trattato di architettura, ingegneria e arte militare, the third of the Quattrocento, after Leone Battista Alberti's and Filarete's; he worked on it for decades and finished sometime after 1482; it circulated in manuscript. The treatise was included in several original manuscripts with one copy (i.e., Codex Mediceo Laurenziano 361) belonged to Leonardo da Vinci who had made notes and sketches within. The projects were well in advance of completed projects at the time, but innovations, for example in staircase planning, running in flights and landings round an open center, or dividing at a landing to return symmetrically on each wall, became part of architectural vocabulary in the following century. The third book is preoccupied with the "ideal" city, constrained within star-shaped polygonal geometries reminiscent of the star fort, whose wedge-shaped bastions are said to have been his innovation.

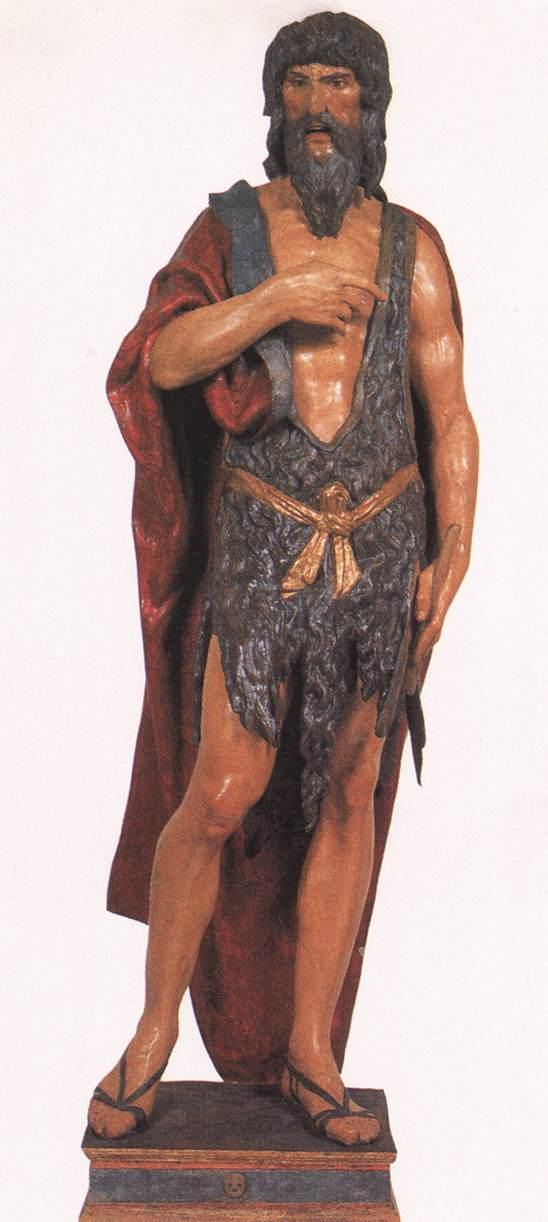
St John the Baptist, 1464 at Museo dell'Opera del Duomo, Siena

Francesco di Giorgio finished his career as the architect in charge of the works at the Duomo di Siena, where his bronze angels are on the high altar and some marble floor mosaics are attributed to his designs. The design of the church of San Sebastiano in Vallepiatta in Siena is also attributed to him.

Francesco di Giorgio's painting of the "Madonna and Child with 2 Angels" is found at the Lowe Art Museum in Coral Gables, Florida.

== Biography ==
=== Early life (1439–1470) ===
Born sometime in 1439 in Siena to a poultry dealer, Francesco Maurizio di Giorgio di Martino was baptised on 23 September 1439. Not much is known about his youth, except that he is assumed to have been a student of Vecchietta due to similarities in style between Francesco di Giorgio's early paintings and those of the master. The first record of his work as an artist is from 1464, when at age 25 he was paid 12 lire for a statue of John the Baptist.

He was married two times in quick succession when his first wife, Cristofana, died shortly after they were married in 1467. On 26 January 1469, he married Agnese, the daughter of Antonio di Benedetto di Neroccio, and possibly a relative of Neroccio di Bartolomeo de' Landi, with whom Francesco di Giorgio shared a studio and an artistic partnership during these years.

=== Early work in Siena (1471–1475) ===
Francesco di Giorgio's early years as a professional artist, architect, and engineer were full of a variety of projects. On top of various artistic commissions that he completed during this time, he and another engineer were given a contract by Siena to work on its aqueduct and fountain system, with the goal of adding about a third more water to the city's water supply. They were able to enlarge the fountain in the Piazza del Campo and make other improvements around the city, successfully fulfilling their contract in 1473. During this period, Francesco di Giorgio was also working with assistants on The Coronation of the Virgin for the Santa Maria della Scala (Siena), a large painted altarpiece.

Sienese records from 1471 describe an episode in which the artist and nine others broke into the Monastery of the Holy Saviour outside Siena and "behaved dishonourably" once inside. They were sentenced to be banished from the city for three months, or to pay a 25 lire fine, which Di Giorgio paid.

=== Urbino (1475–1484) ===
Santa Maria delle Grazie al Calcinaio, built in 1485 in Cortona

During the mid-1470s, Di Giorgio came into the employ of Federico da Montefeltro, Duke of Urbino. He created multiple artistic works for the Duke, including the bronze relief Deposition from the Cross and served as an architect and engineer for the duke during the Pazzi conspiracy. In the fighting between Italian city-states which followed, Di Giorgio constructed a series of great fortifications for his patron. This source of employment for Di Giorgio continued after da Montefeltro's death, with his son the new duke.

Architectural work also came to Di Giorgio through his employment with the Duke, including what is probably his most famous building, Santa Maria delle Grazie al Calcinaio in Cortona. The church was challenging to design due to the steep incline of its location, but Di Giorgio's skill with engineering and architecture allowed him to design a solid building which still stands.

=== Return to Siena and Later Career (1485–1500) ===
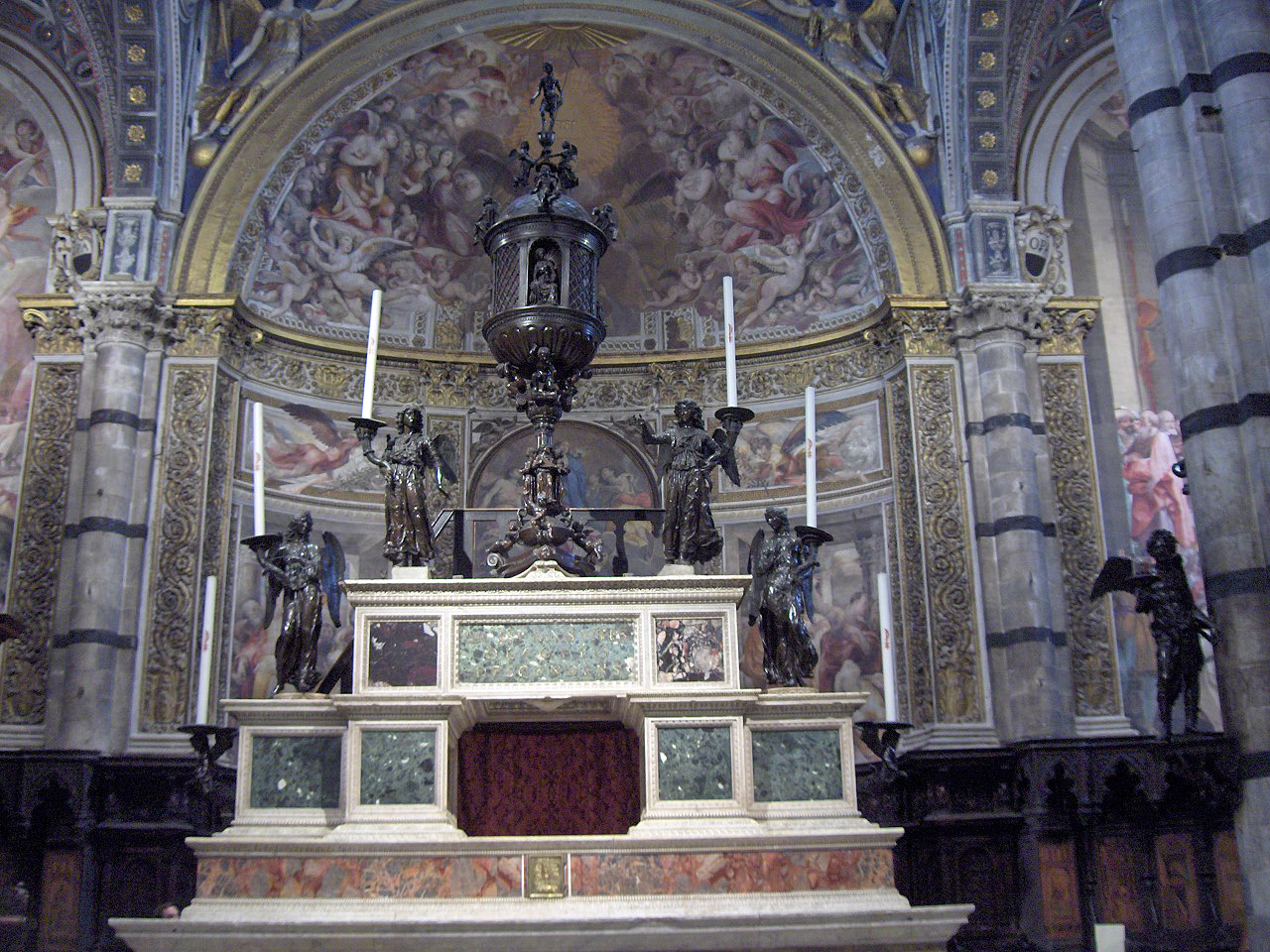
Altar at the Opera del Duomo in Siena. The angel candelabras are the work of Francesco di Giorgio.

Letters from 1485 reveal that the Sienese government wrote to Francesco di Giorgio to request that he return to his native city and embark on the design and construction of public buildings. He did return to the city in 1486 and began receiving an annual salary of 800 florins for his position as official city engineer in which he would inspect all engineering projects throughout Siena. Di Giorgio also completed artistic projects for the city, such as the candle-holding angel sculptures which he contributed to the altar at the Opera del Duomo.

This time was one of prosperity and popularity for Di Giorgio, whose presence and expertise were fought over by the rulers of several city-states, particularly Siena and Urbino. His tax documents from 1488 show material wealth as well as familial wealth in the form of six children.

In 1490, he was commissioned by the government of Milan to produce a model for the dome of the Milan Cathedral. This project led him to journey to the site of the cathedral, where he met Leonardo da Vinci, who had also been hired to consult on the building. Di Giorgio apparently provided useful advice to the constructors of the cathedral, and was paid 100 florins for his trouble.

His expertise as a war engineer came into play again during the Italian War of 1494–98, when he was in the employ of Ferdinand II of Naples. He used tunnels and explosives in what is considered the pioneering use of mining technology for warfare.

In 1499 Di Giorgio was elected the capomaestro of the Opera del Duomo.

=== Death (1501) ===
Francesco di Giorgio died at the age of 62 outside Siena in 1501 or early 1502, having retired to the countryside in mid-1501. His widow spent most of the rest of her life embroiled in legal battles related to the late architect's estate.

== See also ==
- Taccola, Sienese Renaissance engineer
- Renaissance in Urbino
