= Palazzo Chigi alla Postierla =

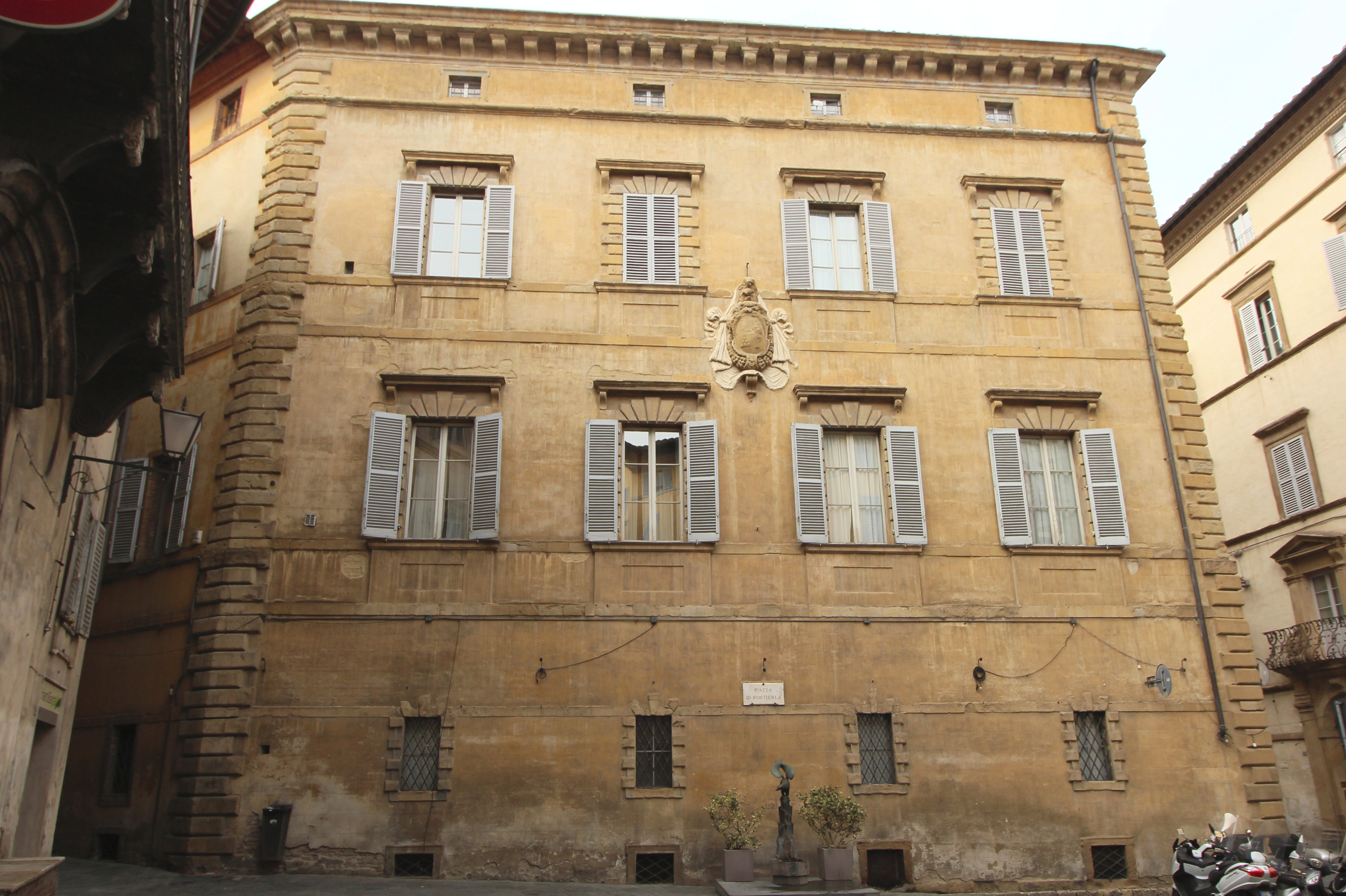
Facade of Palazzo Chigi all Postierla.

The Palazzo Chigi all Postierla, but sometimes referred also to as Chigi-Piccolomini or Piccolomini-Adami is a Renaissance style urban palace localized on Via del Capitano #1, corner Piazza Postierla, in the Terzo di Città, in the city of Siena, region of Tuscany, Italy. The palace is up the street from the Palazzo del Capitano del Popolo, Siena.

== History ==
The corner palace, with the round stone portal was commissioned by Scipione di Cristofano Chigi in the 16th century. The design is attributed the Bartolomeo Neroni. The palace remained in the Chigi family till 1785. In 1919, it was owned by Giorgio Piccolomini Adami. It was sold to the state in 1959.

The palace is notable because two rooms in the main floor retain the late Renaissance decoration (1573), including stuccoes by Marcello Sparti and frescoes by Bernard van Rantwyck. The ceilings depict biblical episodes from the old testament. The twelve sybils are painted in the spandrels. One scene depicts the Chariot of Fire of Elias, and Jacob's ladder and Isaiah. Two niches have figures of Samson and David. Another room is frescoed with the Story of Camillus. Wall canvases have paintings of Roman history. Other rooms have mythologic frescoes.

In 2014, the palace housed offices of the Soprintendenza per i Beni Architettonici e per il Paesaggio per le province di Siena e Grosseto.

In the Piazza in front of the palace stands 15th century column surmounted by an iron statue of the Lupa Senese or Sienese Wolf, symbol of the city. The fountain in the piazza is surmounted by an eagle, marking this area as part of the Contrada dell'Aquila.
