= San Pietro a Ovile, Siena =

Roman Catholic church in Siena, Italy

Coordinates: 43.321402°N 11.332394°E

San Pietro a Ovile
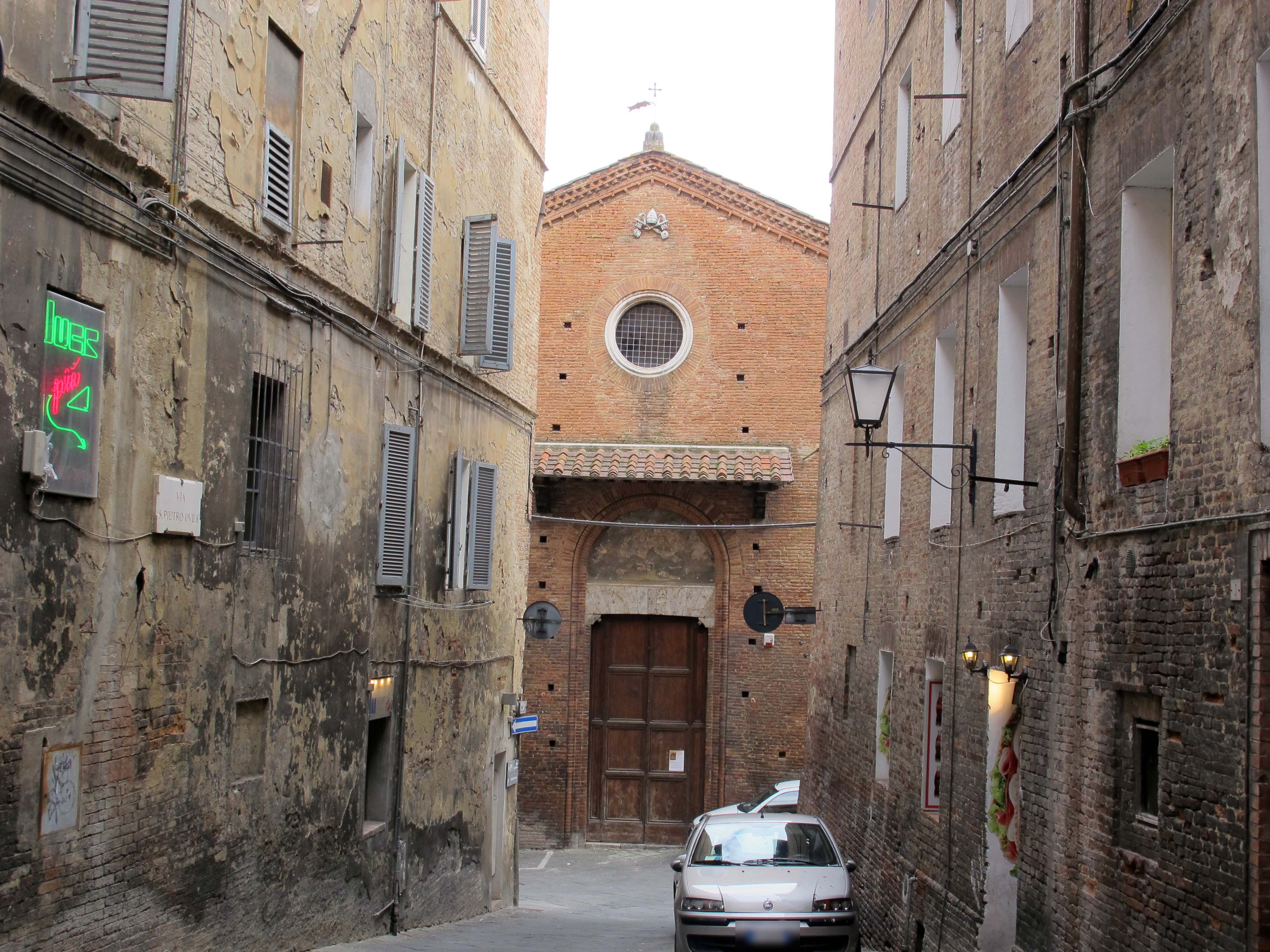

Religion
- Affiliation: Roman Catholic

Location
- Interactive map of San Pietro a Ovile

Architecture
- Groundbreaking: 13th century
- Completed: 18th century

San Pietro a Ovile is a medieval Roman Catholic church located on the Via del Giglio in Siena, Tuscany, Italy.

== History ==
Originally built by the Franciscan order in the 13th century in Romanesque style, the church was attached to a hospice. The church underwent reconstruction in 1753-1758. Now only the façade with its bells remain evident from the original church. The entrance portal has deteriorated frescoes by Rutilio Manetti.

The church still houses frescoes of the Life of St Pietro by Apollonio Nasini, the son of Giuseppe Nicola, on the lateral walls; and an Annunciation attributed to Bartolo di Fredi in the apse. Other fragmentary frescoes in the apse are attributed to unknown 13th century painter(s). The inventory of 1840 by Romagnoli lists a Glory of St Joseph (1634) attributed to Simondio Salimbeni.
