= Radicondoli =

- Comune
- Comune di Radicondoli
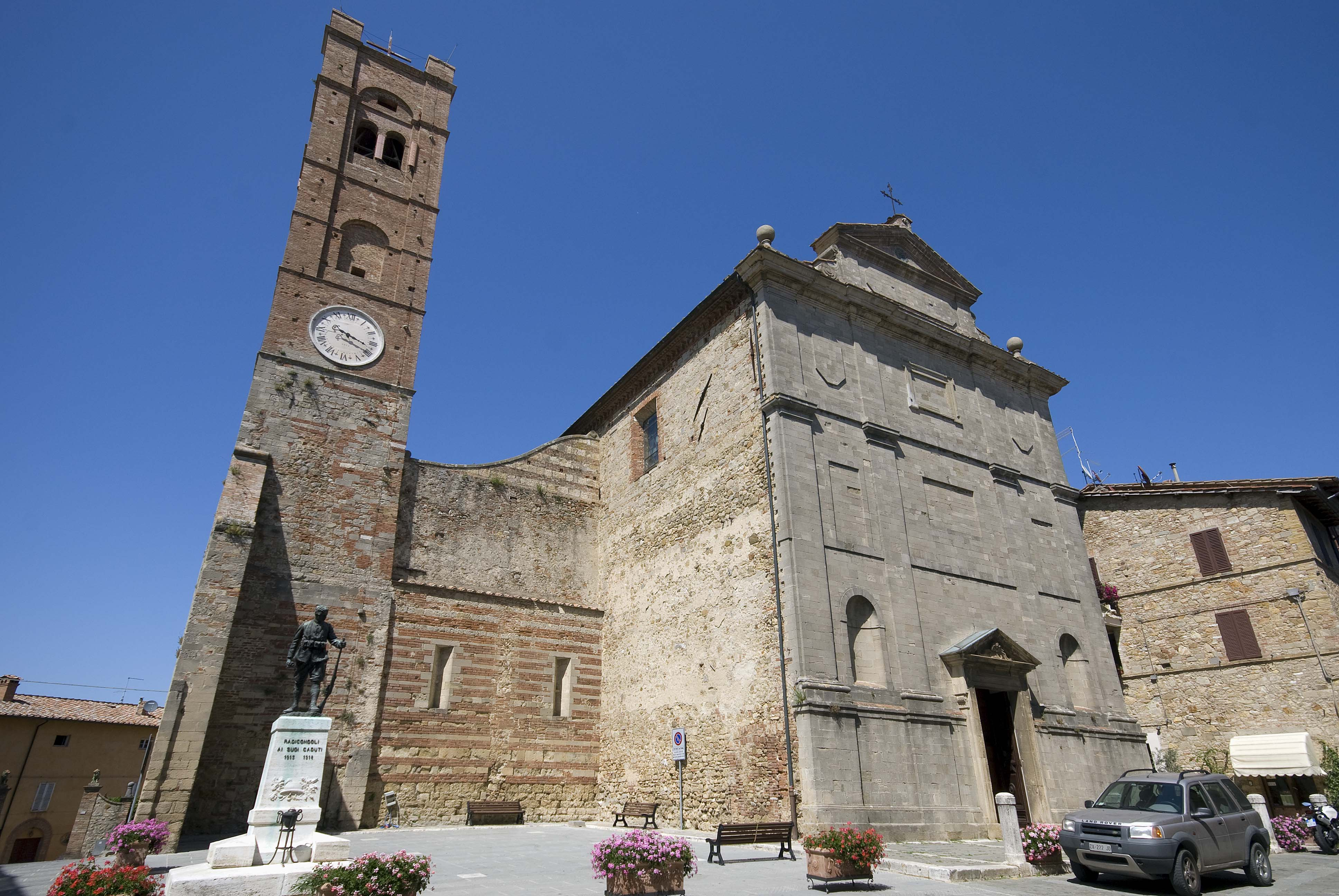
- Collegiata dei Santi Simone e Giuda in Radicondoli

- Coat of arms

- Location within Italy Location within Tuscany
- Coordinates: 43°16′N 11°3′E
- Country: Italy
- Region: Tuscany
- Province: Siena (SI)
- Frazioni: Anqua, Belforte

Area
  - Total: 132.57 km^{2} (51.19 sq mi)
- Elevation: 509 m (1,670 ft)

Population (31 December 2016)
  - Total: 937
  - Density: 7.07/km^{2} (18.3/sq mi)
- Time zone: UTC+1 (CET)
  - Summer (DST): UTC+2 (CEST)
- Postal code: 53030
- Dialing code: 0577
- Website: Official website

Radicondoli is a comune (municipality) in the Province of Siena in the Italian region Tuscany, located about 60 kilometres (37 mi) southwest of Florence and about 25 kilometres (16 mi) southwest of Siena.

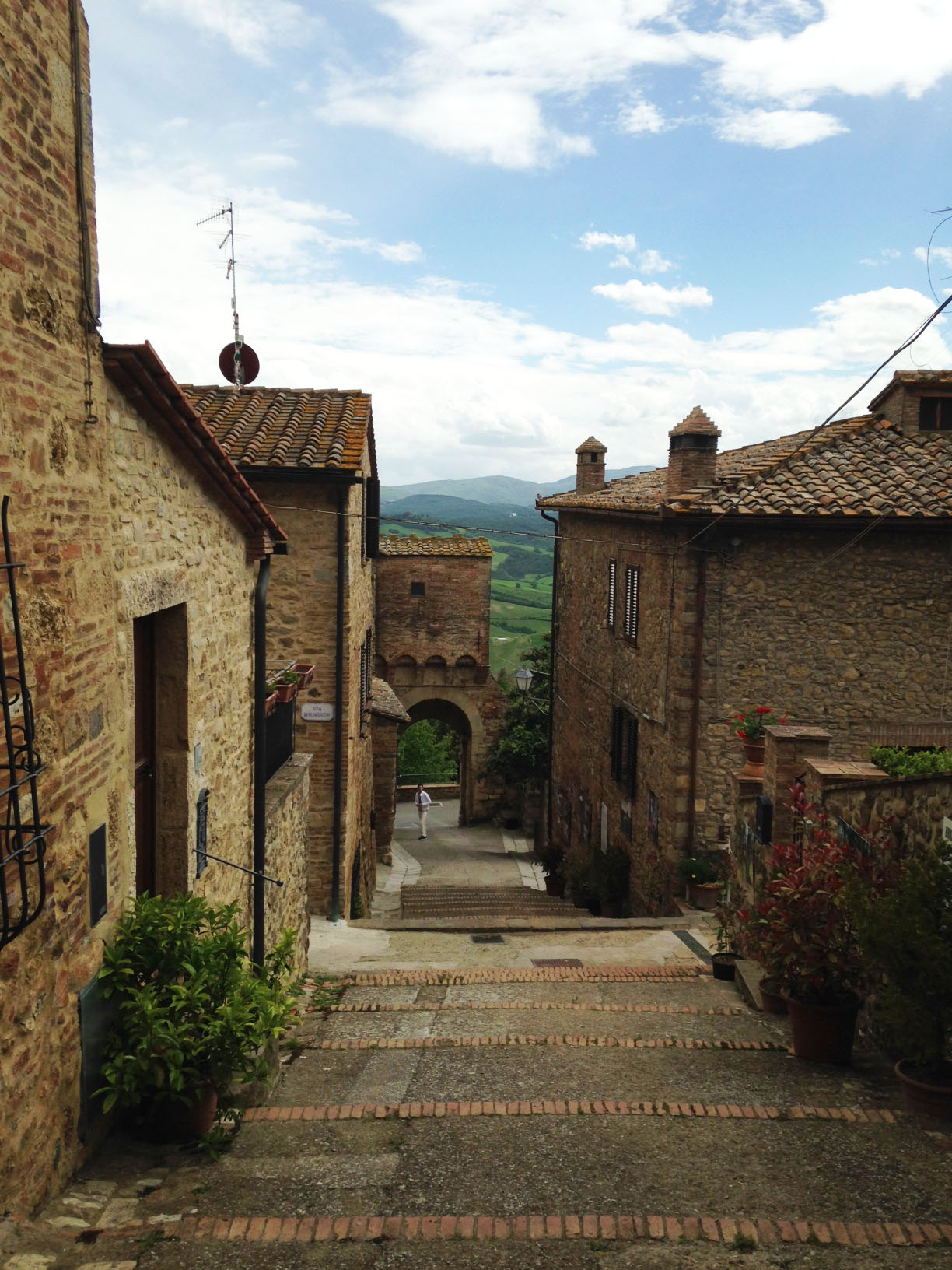
Street view

== Main sights ==
Churches in Radicondoli include the Collegiata dei Santi Simone e Giuda, with works by Pietro di Domenico and Alessandro Casolani.

== People ==
Luciano Berio, Italian composer who lived in Radicondoli from 1972.
