= Pietro Sorri =

Italian painter (c.1556–1622)

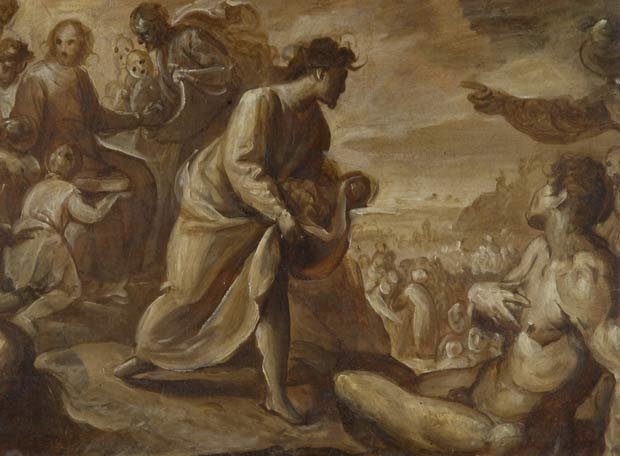
Multiplication of Loaves and Fishes, Uffizi

Pietro Sorri (1558-1622) was an Italian painter active in Siena.

== Biography ==
He first studied under Arcangelo Salimbeni (father of Ventura), and afterwards under Cavaliere Domenico Passignano, whom he accompanied to Venice. Several of his works are in Florence and other cities of Tuscany, particularly at Pisa; he painted landscapes and portraits as well as history. Among his pupils were Giovanni Stefano Rossi, Bernardo Strozzi, and Astolfo Petrozzi. He was also active in Lucca, Genoa, Milan, and Pavia.

He painted an altarpiece for the church of San Ambrogio in Massa di Carrara.

== Works ==
- Death of Saint Anthony the Abbot (around 1602), Louvrem, Paris
- Trinity and Saints, altarpiece at the Sant'Agostine (St. Augustine) church, Siena
- Gesù benedicente, la Vergine e i Santi Francesco e Andrea (signed and dated in 1605), Saint Francis Basilica, Siena
- Frescoes at the Certosa di Pavia with Alessandro Casolani
- Portrait of an Artist, Uffizi Gallery, Florence
