= Mystical Marriage of Saint Catherine (disambiguation) =

(The) Mystic(al) Marriage of Saint/St. Catherine may refer to any of a large number of paintings of the Mystical marriage of Saint Catherine, a few of which are:

- Mystic Marriage of Saint Catherine (Spinello Aretino), c. 1390 painting in the nearby Cialli-Seringi Chapel in Santa Trinita in Florence, Italy
- Mystic Marriage of Saint Catherine (Correggio), mid-1520s painting in the Louvre, Paris, France
- Mystic Marriage of Saint Catherine (Correggio, Detroit), c. 1512 painting in the Detroit Institute of Arts, Detroit, Michigan
- Mystic Marriage of Saint Catherine (Correggio, Naples), c. 1520 painting in the National Museum of Capodimonte in Naples, Italy
- Mystic Marriage of Saint Catherine (Correggio, Washington), c. 1510–1511 painting in the National Gallery of Art in Washington D.C.
- Marriage of St. Catherine (Filippino Lippi), 1503 painting in the Basilica di San Domenico, Bologna, Italy
- Mystic Marriage of Saint Catherine (Lotto, Munich), 1506–1508 painting in the Alte Pinakothek in Munich, Germany
- Mystic Marriage of St. Catherine (Memling), c. 1480 painting in the Metropolitan Museum of Art, New York
- Mystical Marriage of Saint Catherine (Michelino da Besozzo), c.1420 painting in the Pinacoteca Nazionale of Siena, Italy
- Mystic Marriage of Saint Catherine (Moretto), c. 1543 painting in the church of San Clemente in Brescia, Italy
- Mystic Marriage of Saint Catherine (Moroni), 1567–1570 painting in the church of San Bartolomeo, parish church of Almenno San Bartolomeo, Italy
- Mystical Marriage of Saint Catherine (Parmigianino), known as the Bardi Altarpiece, c.1521 painting in the church of Santa Maria at Bardi, Emilia-Romagna, Italy
- Mystic Marriage of Saint Catherine (Parmigianino, Louvre), c. 1529 painting in the Louvre, Paris, France
- Mystic Marriage of Saint Catherine (Parmigianino, National Gallery), c. 1529 painting in the National Gallery, London, UK
- Mystic Marriage of Saint Catherine (Parmigianino, National Gallery of Parma), c. 1524 painting in the Galleria nazionale di Parma, Parma, Italy
- Mystic Marriage of Saint Catherine (Procaccini), c. 1616–1620 painting in the Pinacoteca di Brera in Milan, Italy
- Mystic Marriage of Saint Catherine (Andrea del Sarto), c. 1512–1513 painting in the Gemäldegalerie in Dresden, Germany
- Mystic Marriage of Saint Catherine (Veronese, circa 1547–1550), c. 1547–1550 painting in the Yale University Art Gallery, New Haven, Connecticut
- Mystic Marriage of Saint Catherine (Veronese, 1575), c. 1575 painting in the Gallerie dell'Accademia, Venice, Italy
- Mystical Marriage of Saint Catherine of Alexandria (Wautier), 1649 painting in the diocesan seminary of Namur, Belgium

== See also ==
- Mystical Marriage of St Catherine and Saints (Lotto)
- Mystical Marriage of St Catherine of Alexandria with Niccoló Bonghi
