= The Marriage of the Virgin (Michelino da Besozzo) =

Painting by Michelino da Besozzo

Marriage of the Virgin
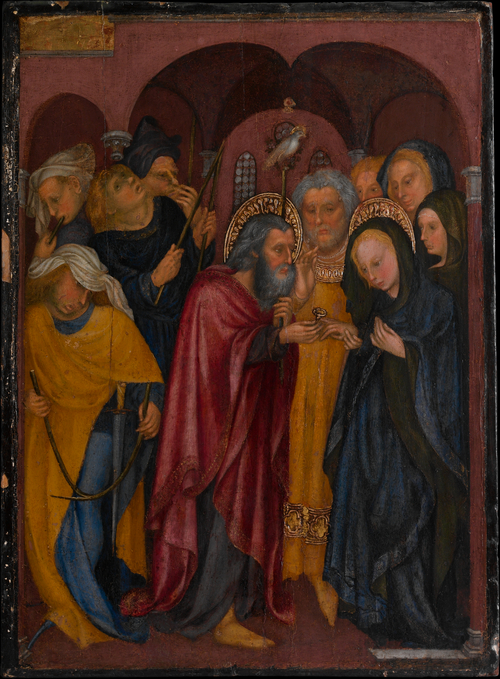
- Artist: Michelino da Besozzo
- Year: c. 1435
- Medium: Tempera on panel
- Dimensions: 65.1 cm × 47.6 cm (25.6 in × 18.7 in)
- Location: Metropolitan Museum of Art, New York

The Marriage of the Virgin is a painting by the Italian late medieval painter Michelino da Besozzo, dating from c. 1435 and housed in the Metropolitan Museum of Art of New York.

It is the artist's only certain one alongside Mystical Marriage of Saint Catherine in the Pinacoteca Nazionale at Siena.

== Description ==
The painting depicts the Virgin Mary while receiving the marriage ring by Saint Joseph, in front of a priest of the Temple of Jerusalem. Michelino painted a Dove of the Holy Ghost above Joseph, to underline the supernatural choice of him as Mary's husband. At the right is a group of women, while on the left are the other pretenders, painted in angered postures: one, in the foreground, is cracking a stick. The latter is a theme found in numerous following representation of the scene, including Raphael's.

The scene is set in a portico, with limited use of gold in the background, showing that is a late work by Michelino.

== Sources ==
- L'arte italiana. Florence: Giunti. 2000. ISBN 88-09-01770-6.
