= Mystical Marriage of St Catherine of Alexandria with Niccoló Bonghi =

Painting by Lorenzo Lotto

Mystic Marriage of St Catherine of Alexandria with Niccoló Bonghi
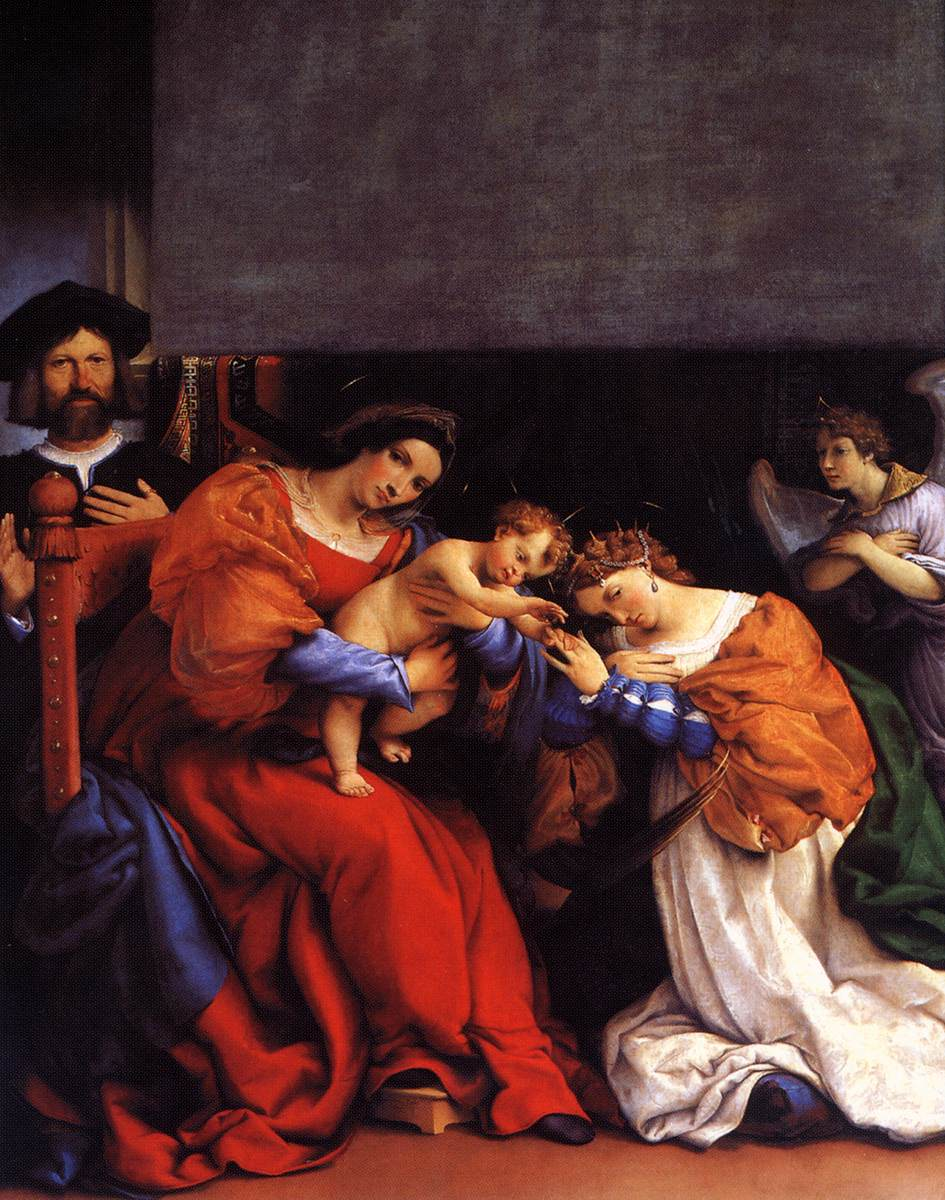
- Artist: Lorenzo Lotto
- Year: 1523
- Medium: Oil on panel
- Dimensions: 189 cm × 134 cm (74 in × 53 in)
- Location: Accademia Carrara, Bergamo

Mystical Marriage of St Catherine of Alexandria with Niccoló Bonghi is an oil-on-panel painting by Lorenzo Lotto, executed in 1523, in the Collections of the Accademia Carrara, Bergamo, Italy.

== Description ==
The work was commissioned in 1523 by the Bergamese merchant Niccoló Bonghi, who is depicted on the left, behind the Virgin. The painting depicts the Mystical marriage of Saint Catherine, a vision of a chaste union with Jesus, in which the saint has forsaken terrestrial marriage in order to live a consecrated life. Jesus is depicted as an infant or child in the ceremony. The mystical marriage of St Catherine was echoed in the sacrament of consecration of nuns into a religious order.

The scene depicts the toddler Jesus placing a ring on the finger of a kneeling St Catherine. In her hair, Catherine wears an apparent crown with wheel-like spokes, recalling the instrument (wheel) used in her execution. Behind her an angel kneels. A palm frond of a martyr protrudes from her gown below. The work is signed on the Virgin Mary's foot stool. Behind the Virgin is an oriental rug. In the upper right corner of the painting there once was a window that opened onto a landscape; this was lost when the painting was vandalized in 1528–1529 by French troops.

Lotto would use the event in another painting, Mystical Marriage of St Catherine and Saints, now in the Galleria Nazionale d'Arte Antica (Palazzo Barberini) in Rome.
