= The Mystic Marriage of Saint Catherine (Poussin) =

Painting by Nicolas Poussin

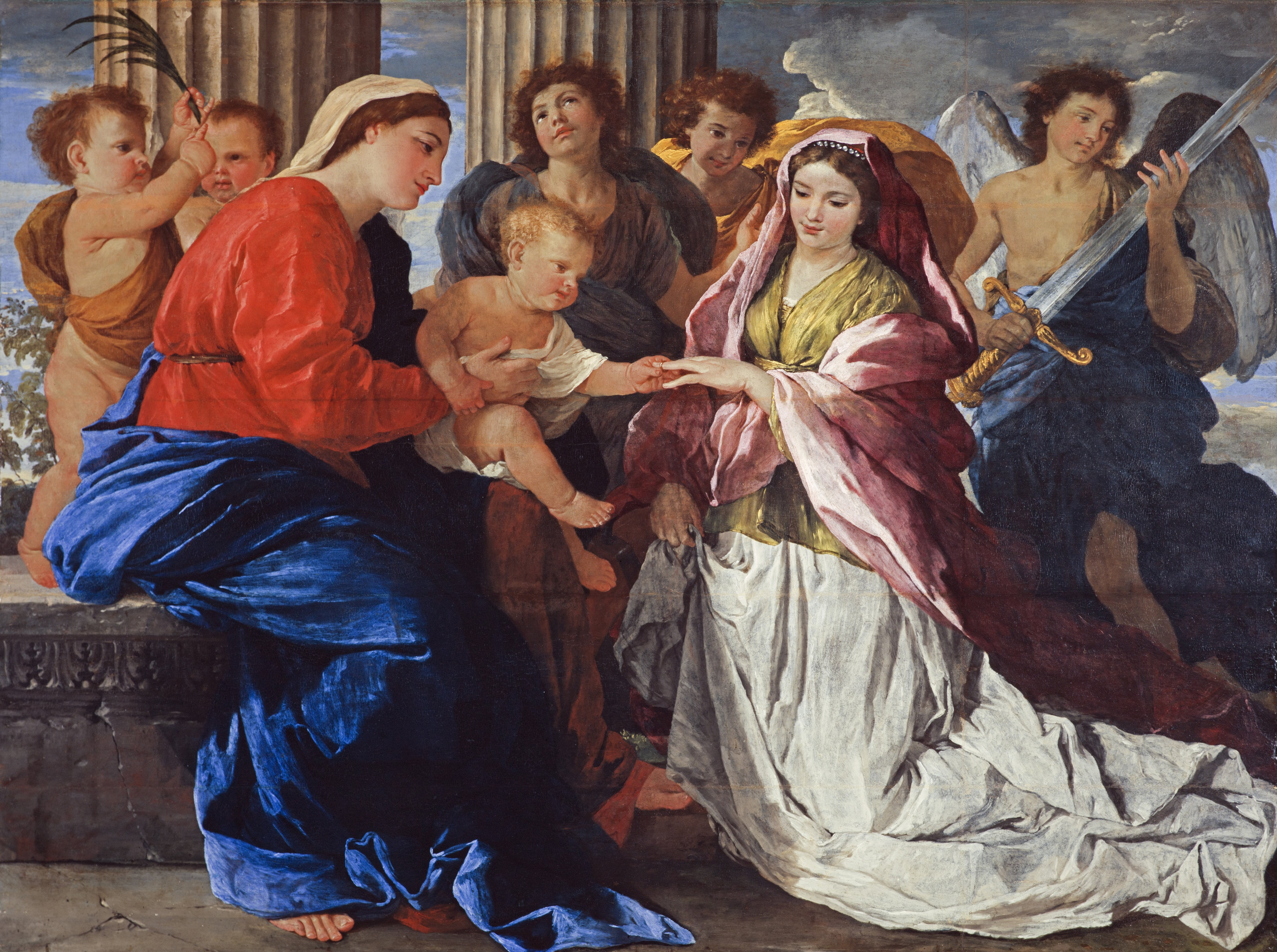
The Mystic Marriage of Saint Catherine, 126 x 168 cm (photographed by Antonia Reeve for National Galleries Scotland)

The Mystic Marriage of Saint Catherine is an oil on panel painting by Nicolas Poussin, dated to about 1628–1629, which depicts the mystical marriage of Saint Catherine to Christ. The picture is now in the Scottish National Gallery, Edinburgh.

== Description ==
The composition of eight figures, representing the Virgin Mary, clothed in red vest and a blue mantle, seated on the viewer's left, bending and holding the Christ child on her knee, while he places a ring on the finger of Saint Catherine: behind is an angel bearing a sword, the instrument of her martyrdom; and on the right are two other angels witnessing the mystical union of Jesus and the Saint. Two infant angels are behind the Virgin, one of whom has a palm branch in his hand. Smith (1837) comments, "This admirable picture is unusually rich and harmonious in its colouring."

== Provenance ==
Once owned by Cassiano dal Pozzo (d. 1657). Later part of the art collection of Humphry Morice (d. 1785), which was purchased by the Earl of Ashburnham in 1786. Auctioned by Christie's several times during the 19th century, before being purchased by Sir Herbert Cook in 1886: thence passed by descent to Sir Francis Cook, 4th Bt, who sold the picture and much of the family art collection in 1946. Later owned by Sir John Heathcoat-Amory, 1st Bt, of Tiverton, Devon; who bequeathed it to the Scottish National Gallery in 1973.

== See also ==
- List of paintings by Nicolas Poussin

== Bibliography ==
- Blunt, Anthony (1966). The Paintings of Nicolas Poussin. Critical Catalogue. London: Phaidon. pp. 66–67 (no. 95).
- Brigstocke, Hugh (1981). Poussin, Sacraments and Bacchanals: Paintings and Drawings on Sacred and Profane Themes by Nicolas Poussin 1594–1665. Edinburgh: National Gallery of Scotland. pp. 8, 26, 28 (nos. 9, 10). ISBN 978-0-903148-38-2.
- Brockwell, Maurice (1915). Cook, Herbert (ed.). A Catalogue of the Paintings at Doughty House, Richmond, & Elsewhere In the Collection of Sir Frederick Cook, Bt., Visconde de Monserrate. Vol. 3. London: William Heinemann. p. 48 (no. 429).
- Smith, John (1837). A Catalogue Raisonné of the Works of the Most Eminent Dutch, Flemish and French Painters: Nicholas Poussin, Claude Lorraine, and Jean Baptist Greuze. Vol. 8. London: Smith and Son. pp. 78–79 (no. 146).
