= Mystical Marriage of Saint Catherine (Michelino da Besozzo) =

Painting by Michelino da Besozzo

Mystical marriage of Saint Catherine
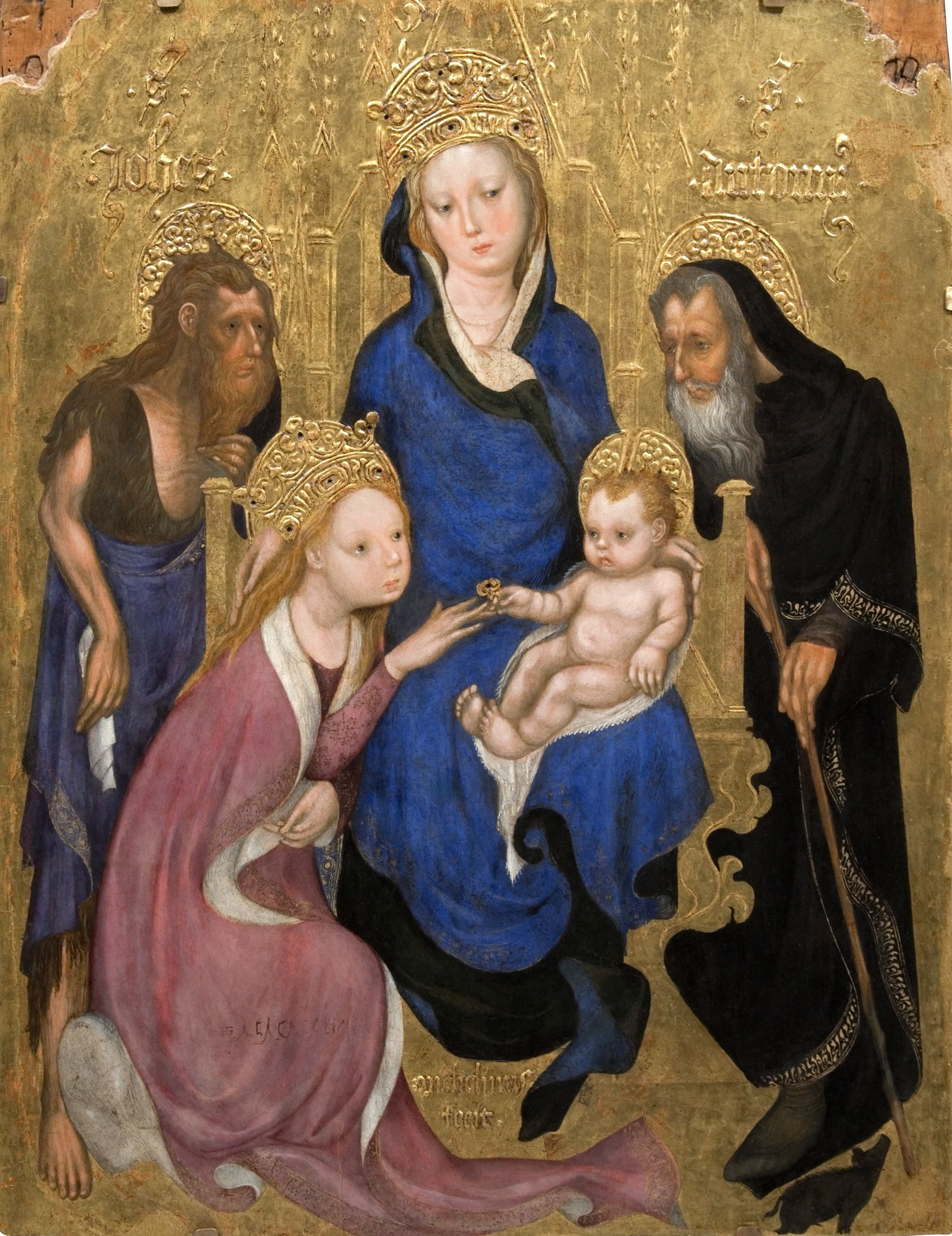
- Artist: Michelino da Besozzo
- Year: c. 1420
- Medium: Tempera on panel
- Dimensions: 78 cm × 58 cm (31 in × 23 in)
- Location: Pinacoteca Nazionale, Siena

The Mystical Marriage of Saint Catherine is a painting by the medieval Italian painter Michelino da Besozzo. The painting dates from c. 1420 and is housed in the Pinacoteca Nazionale of Siena, Italy.

It is the only signed work by the Gothic painter. The only other painting attributed to him with some certainty is Marriage of the Virgin in the Metropolitan Museum of New York.

== Description ==
The painting shows the virgin Mary holding the Christ child on her knees while the child celebrates the symbolic mystical marriage of Saint Catherine of Alexandria by offering her a ring. St. Catherine, kneeling before the Christ child, wears a wide fur-lined rose cloak and gilt crown; her long, blond hair is an attribute of aristocratic women of the time. At the sides are Saint John the Baptist and Saint Anthony the Great, with his typical attribute, a pig, at his feet.

The artist's signature, "Michelinus feci", is located below the Virgin's mantle. The saints' names are written next to them.

== Sources ==
- L'arte italiana. Florence: Giunti. 2000. ISBN 88-09-01770-6.
