= Pinacoteca Nazionale (Siena) =

Art museum in Siena, Tuscany, Italy

Coordinates: 43°18′56″N 11°19′50″E

- Pinacoteca Nazionale di Siena
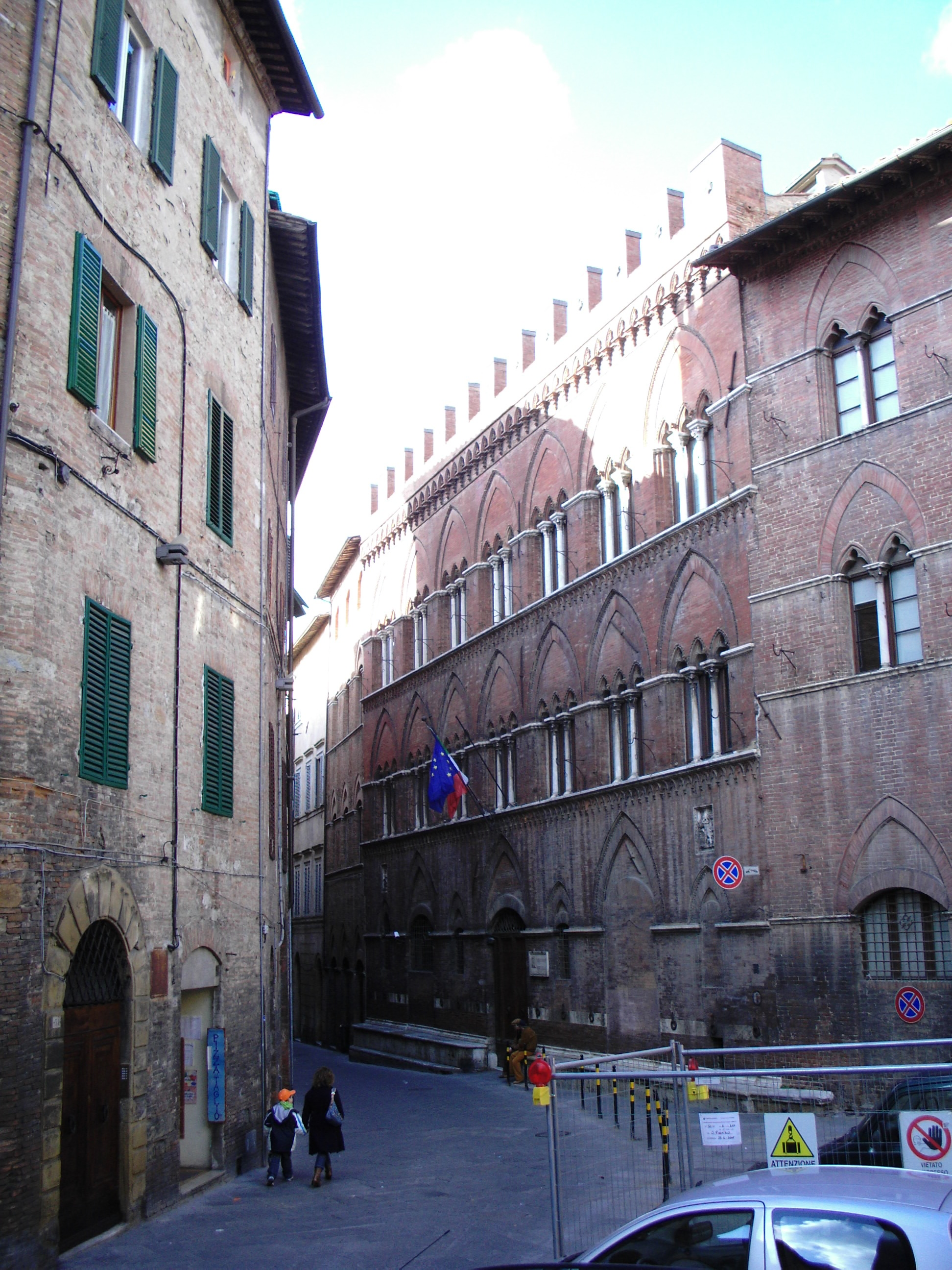
- The exterior view
- Established: 1932
- Location: Via San Pietro 29, Siena, Italy
- Website: www.pinacotecanazionalesiena.it

The Pinacoteca Nazionale is a national museum in Siena, Tuscany, Italy. Inaugurated in 1932, it houses especially late medieval and Renaissance paintings from Italian artists. It is housed in the Brigidi and Buonsignori palaces in the city's center: the former, built in the 14th century, it is traditionally identified as the Pannocchieschi family's residence. The Palazzo Bichi-Buonsignori, built in the 15th century, was until recently thought to have a 19th-century neo-medieval façade based on the city's Palazzo Pubblico; however, restoration in 2022 revealed that it is mostly original.

The gallery has one of the largest collections of Sienese paintings with gold backgrounds from the 14th and 15th centuries.

Works in the gallery include:

- Duccio di Buoninsegna's Polyptych N. 28, Madonna and Child with Saints Polyptych, and Madonna of the Franciscans
- Guido da Siena's St. Peter Enthroned
- Simone Martini's Blessed Agostino Novello and His Miracles (c. 1330)
- Ambrogio Lorenzetti's Annunciation (c. 1344)
- Bartolo di Fredi's Adoration of the Magi
- Michelino da Besozzo's Mystical Marriage of Saint Catherine (c. 1420)
- Il Sodoma's Christ at the Column and Deposition
- Domenico Beccafumi's Birth of the Virgin, St. Michael Expelling the Rebel Angels, Coronation of the Virgin, Trinity Triptych, Marriage of St Catherine, Stigmatization of St. Catherine of Siena, St Lucy and Christ in Limbo

Other artists represented include Ugolino di Nerio, Pietro Lorenzetti, Sassetta, Domenico di Bartolo, Taddeo di Bartolo, Francesco di Giorgio Martini, Matteo di Giovanni, Neroccio di Bartolomeo

== Gallery ==
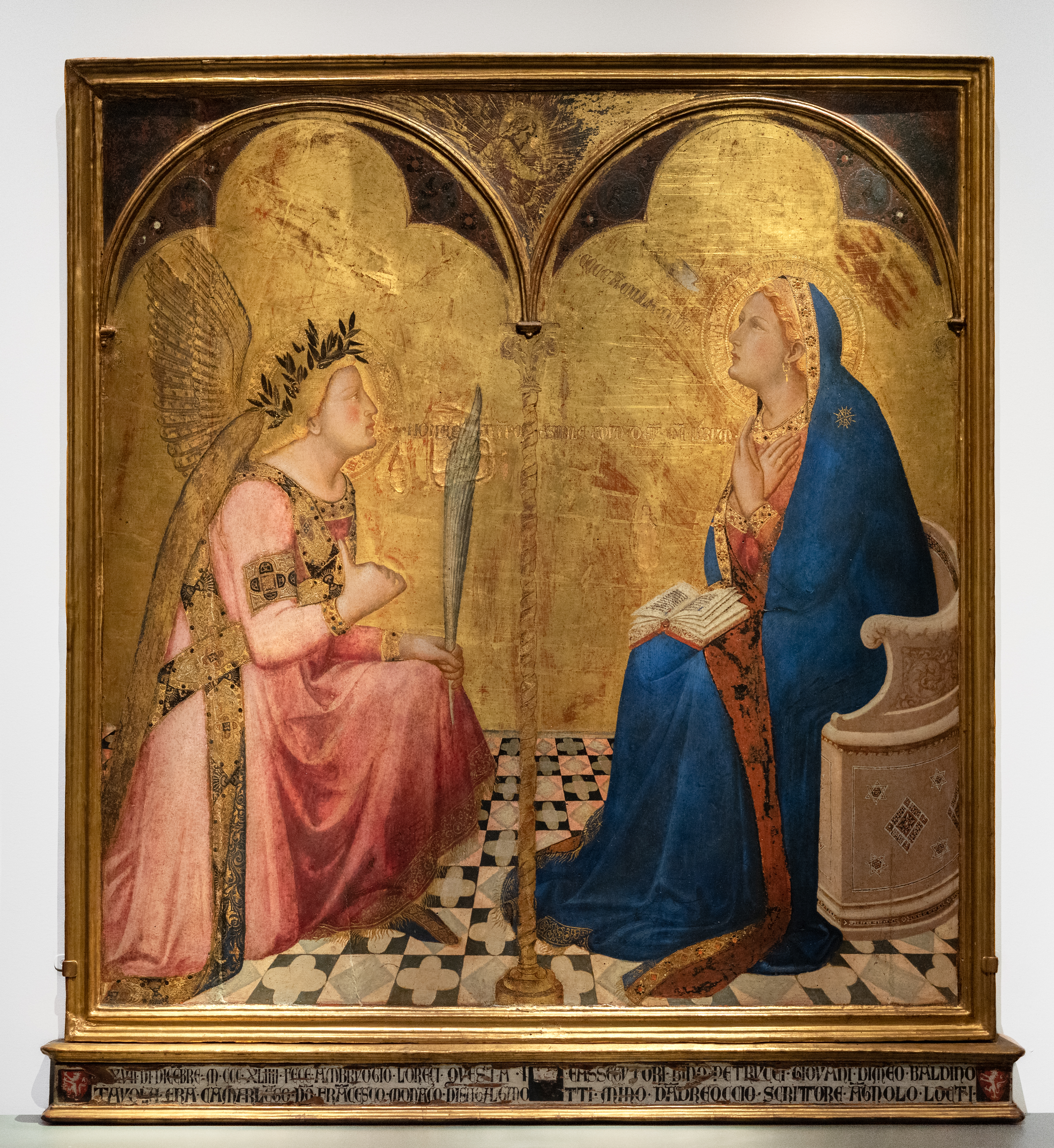
Ambrogio Lorenzetti:
Annunciation, 1344.

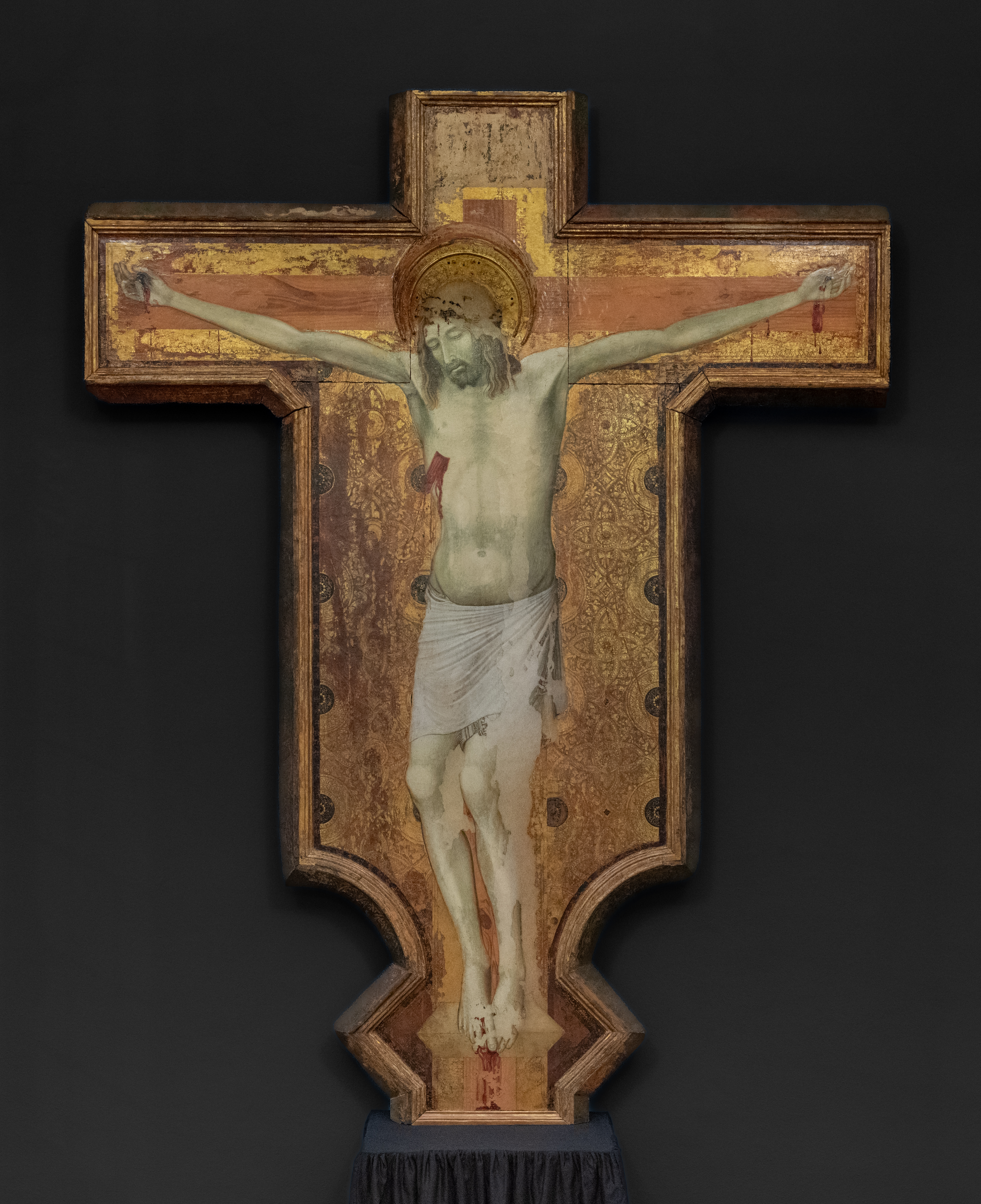
Ambrogio Lorenzetti:
Crucifixion.

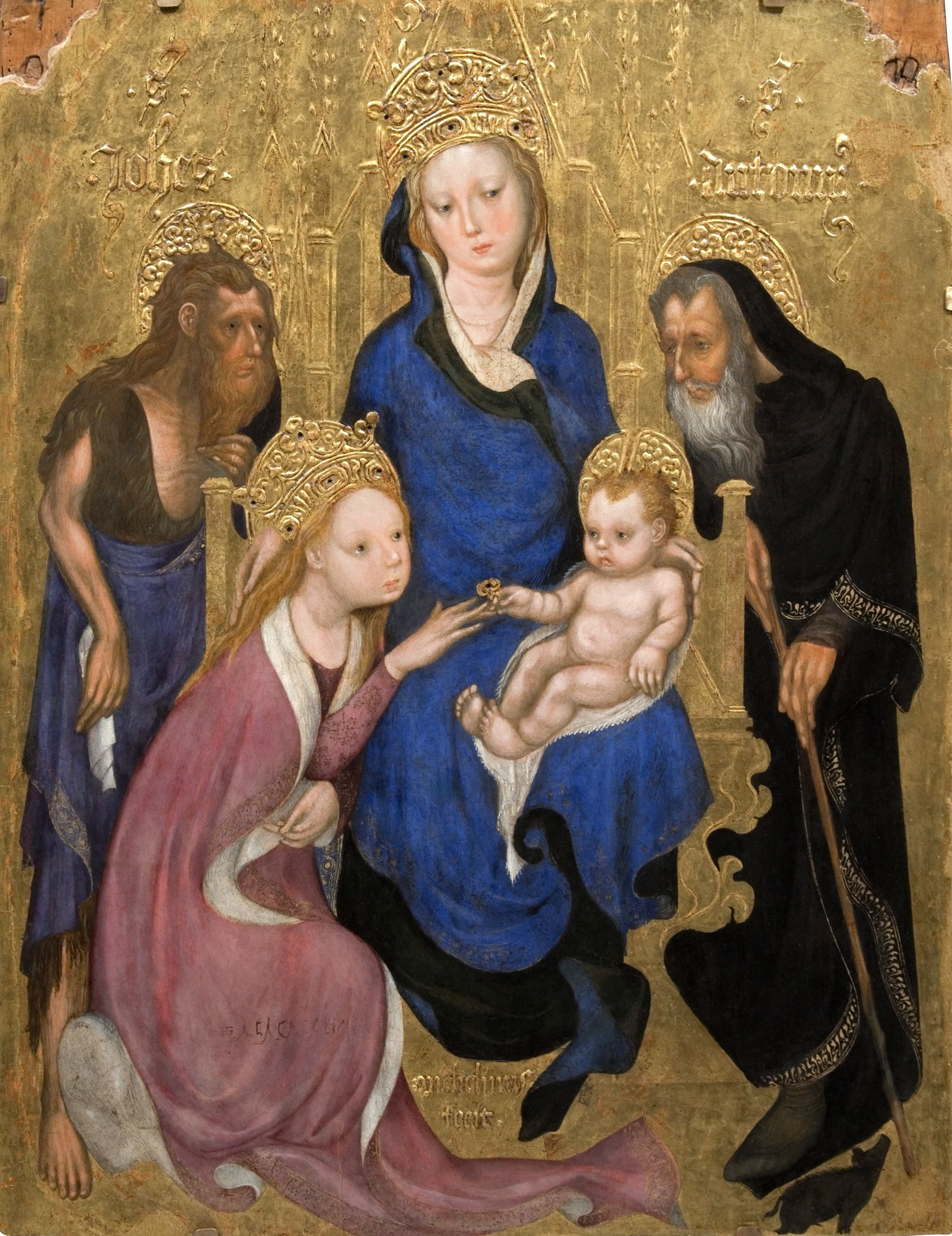
Michelino da Besozzo:
Mystical Marriage of Saint Catherine, c. 1420.

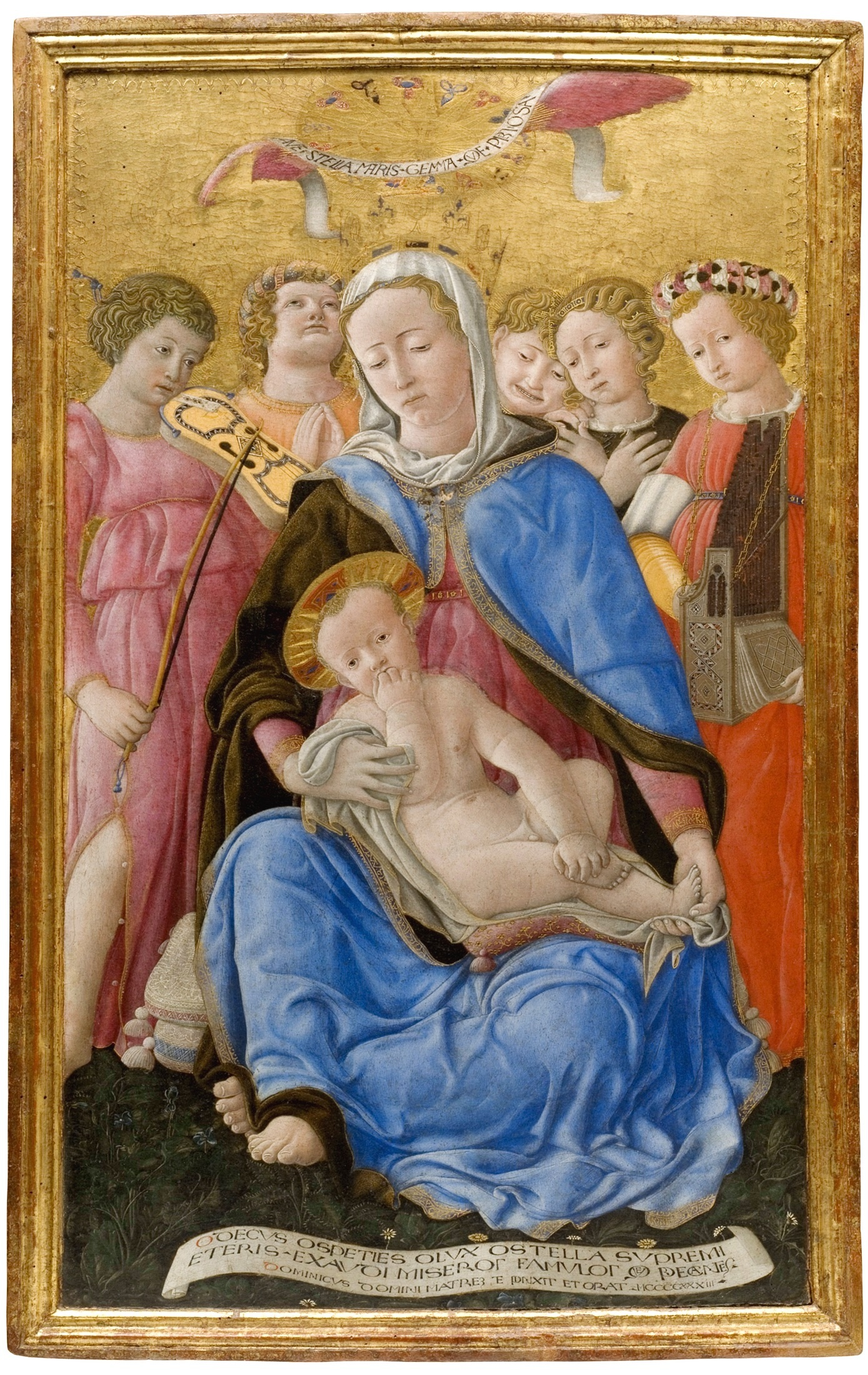
Domenico di Bartolo:
Madonna of Humility, 1433.

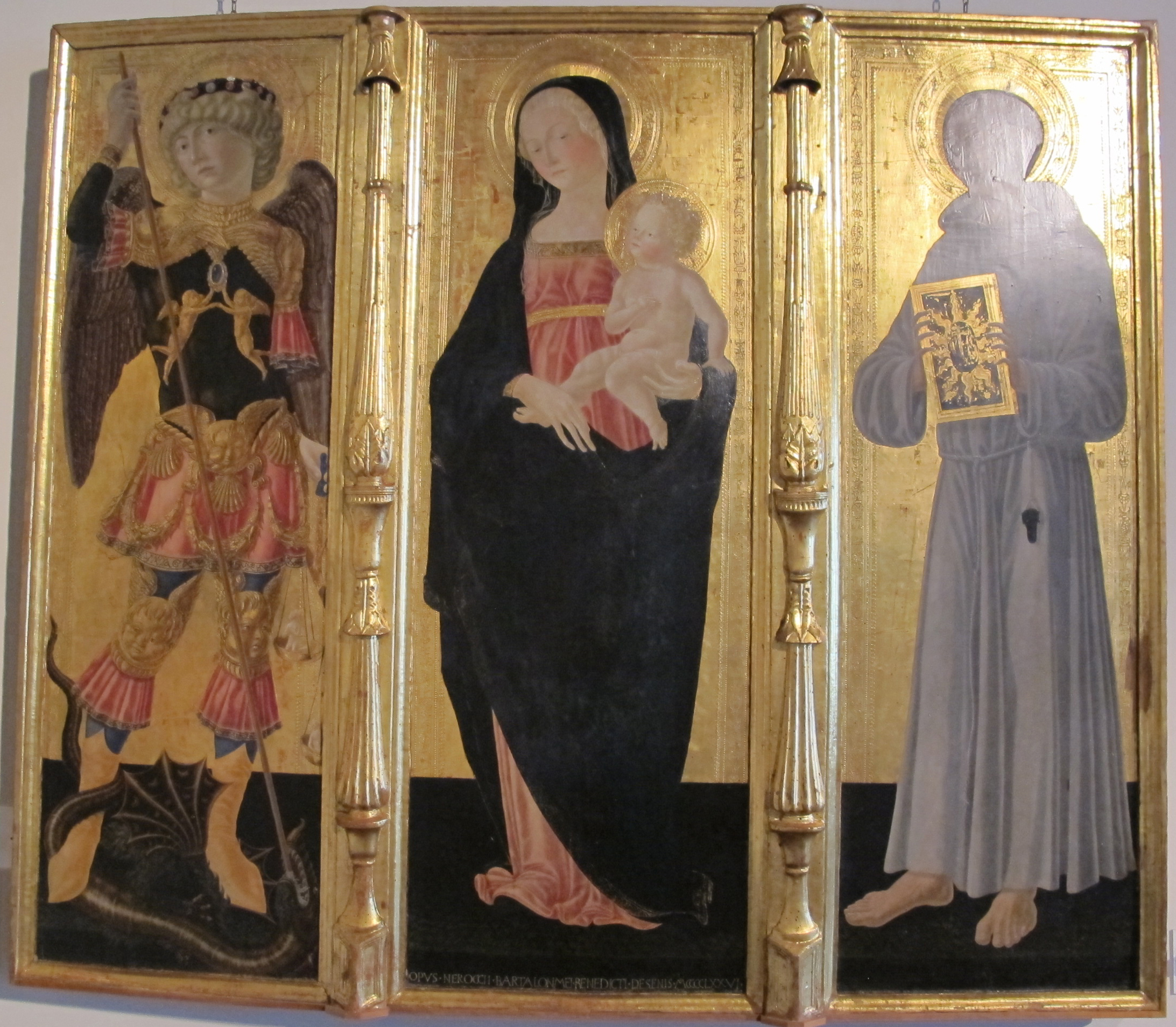
Neroccio di Bartolomeo de' Landi:
Madonna and Child with St Michael and St Bernardino, 1476.

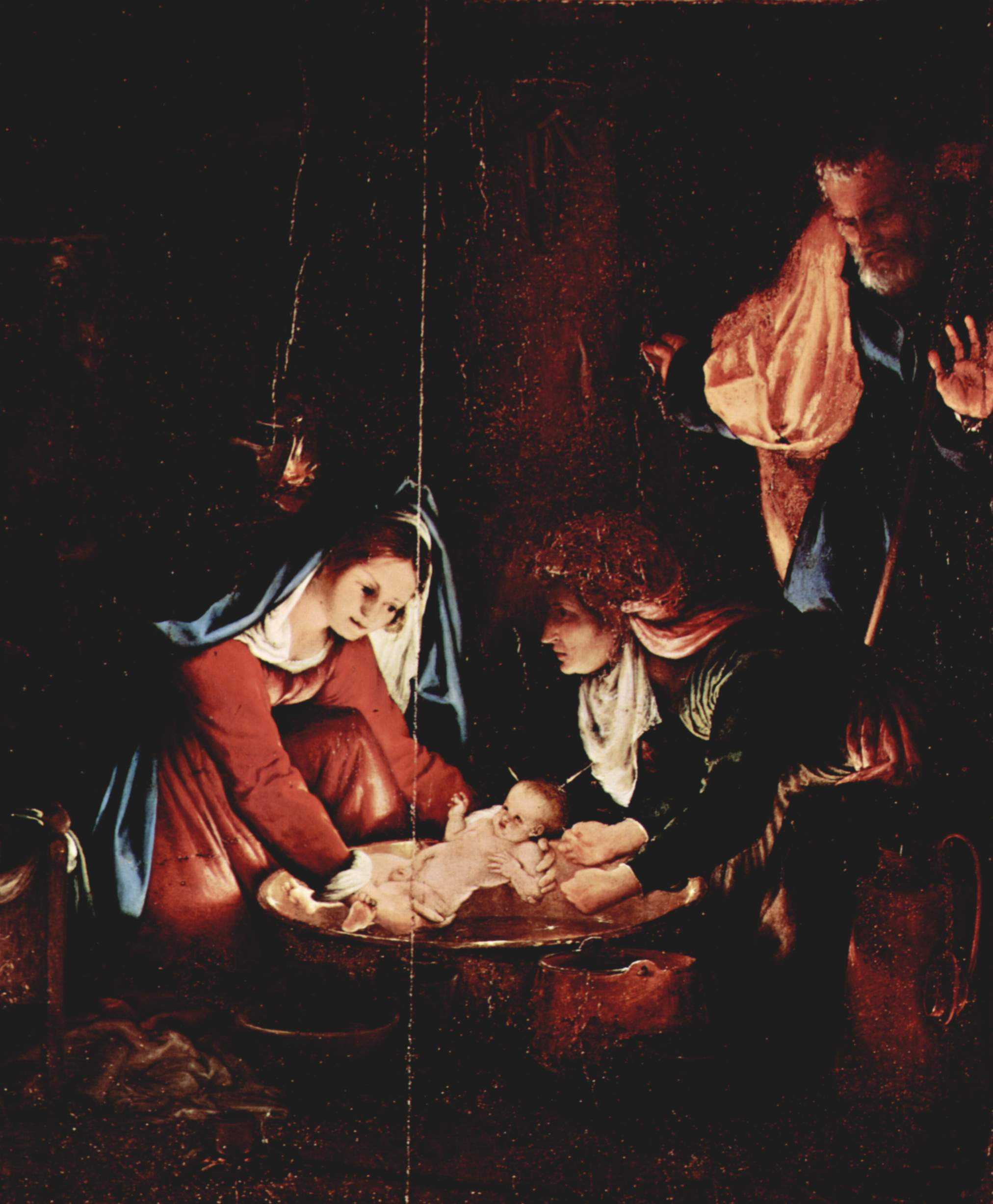
Lorenzo Lotto:
Nativity, 1527–1528.

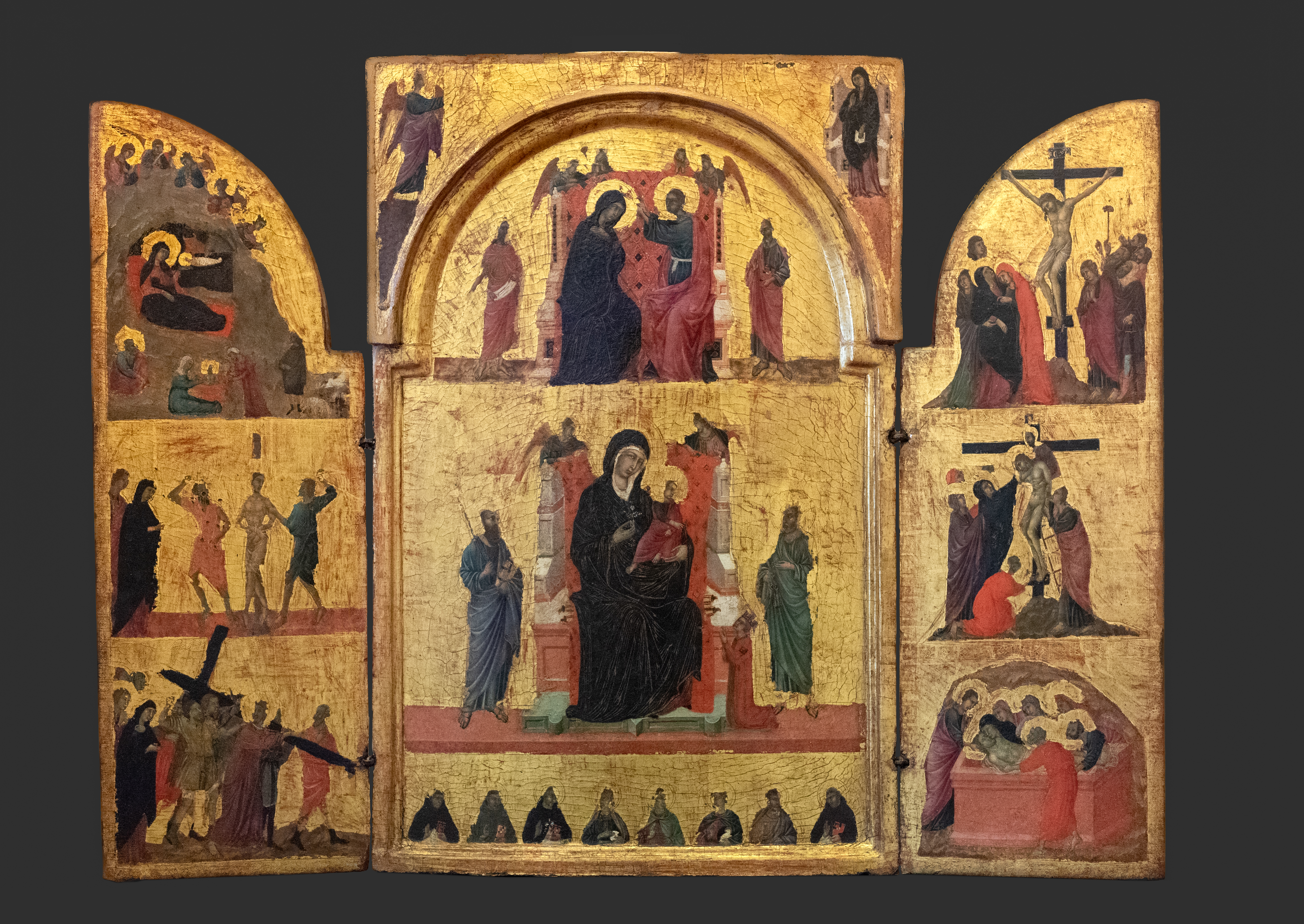
Duccio, Madonna con Bambino in trono, 1311—1313

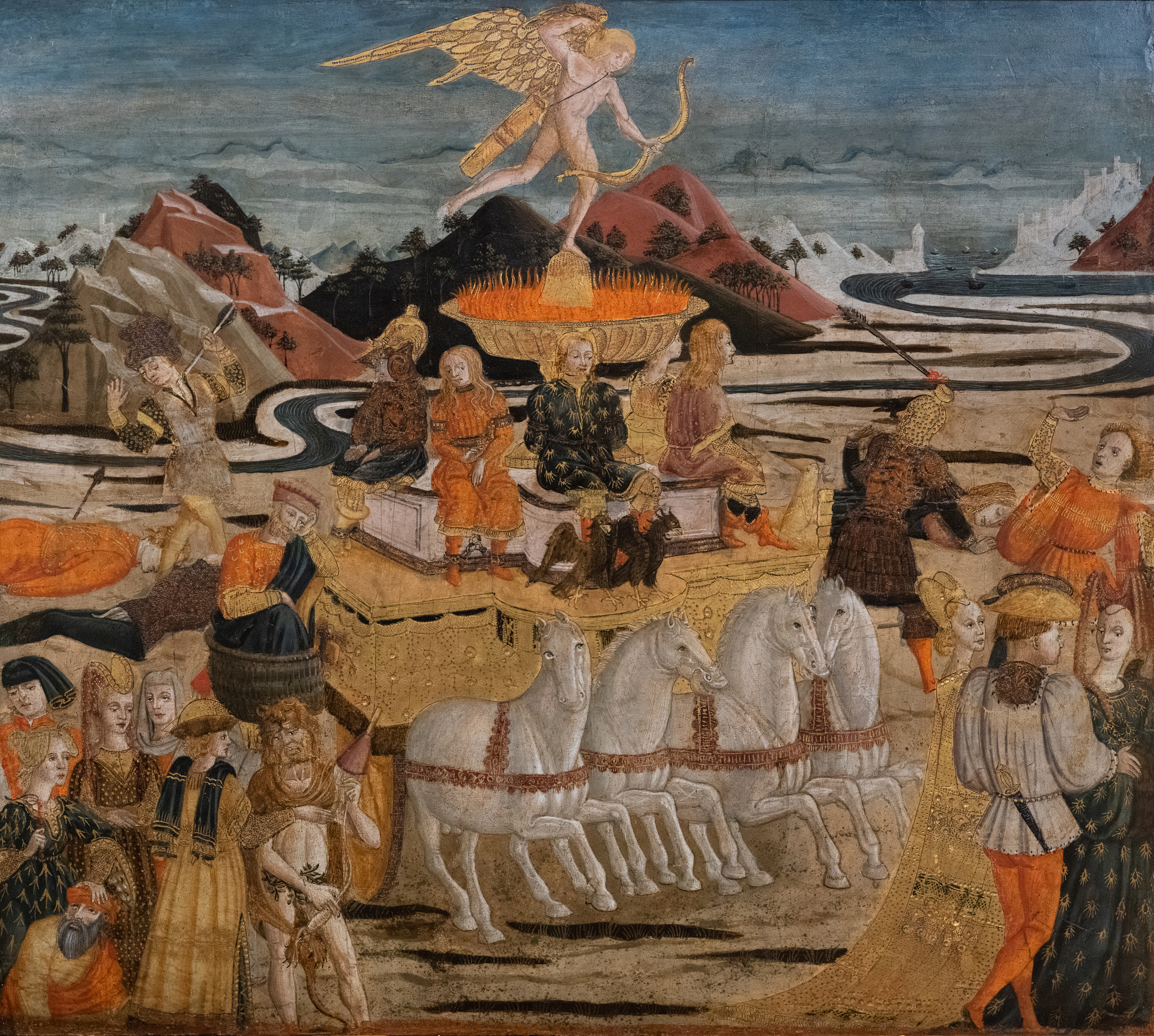
Lo Scheggia, Triumph of love

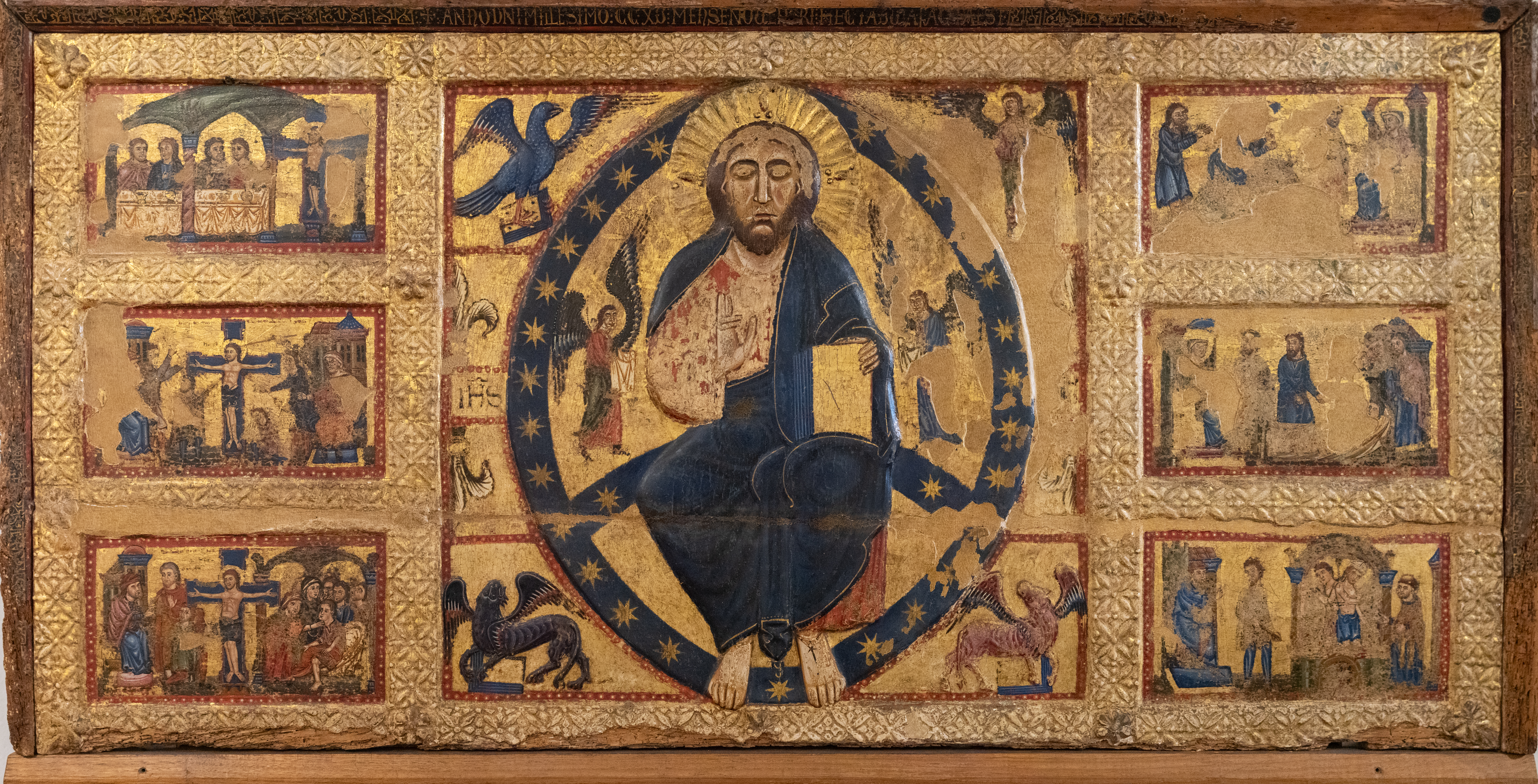
Maestro di Tressa, Paliotto del Salvatore, 1215

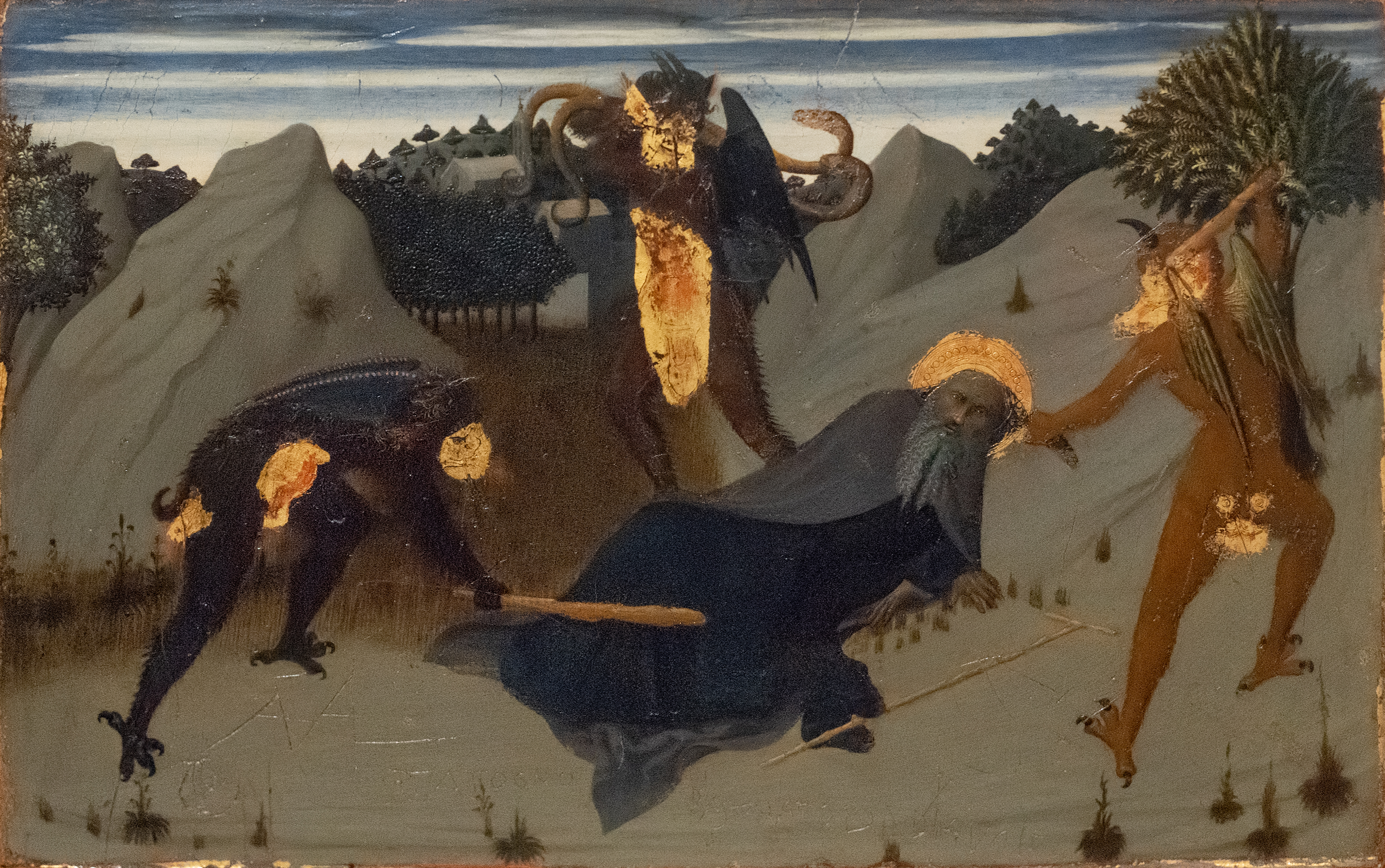
Stefano di Giovanni, St. Anthony Beaten by Devils, c. 1430–1432

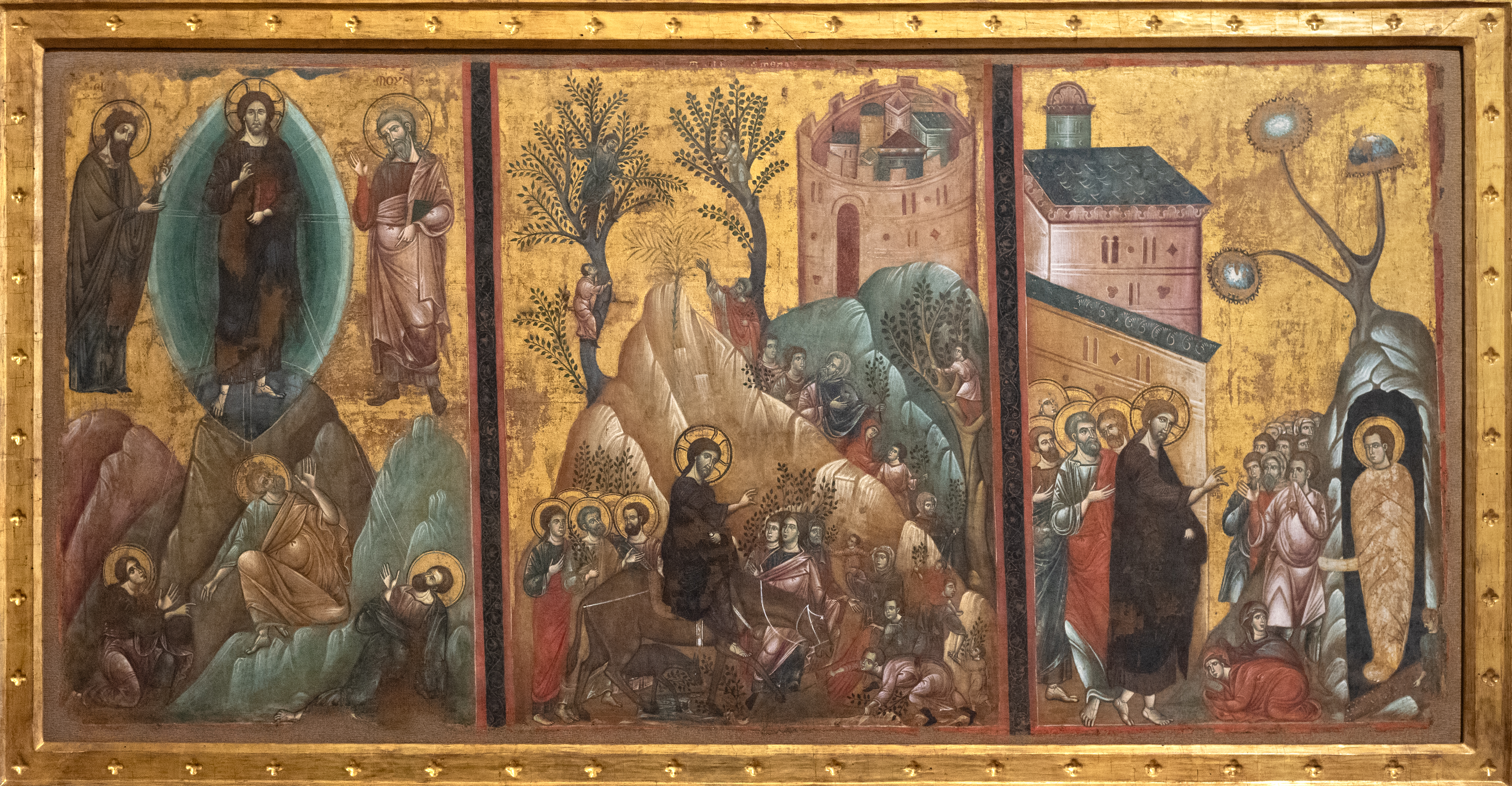
Guido da Siena, Transfiguration, entering Jesuralem, resurrection of Lazarus, 1270.

== See also ==
- List of national galleries

== Sources ==
- Civai, Mauro; Enrico Toti (2004). Siena cuore medievale d'Europa. Il sogno gotico. Siena: Alsaba Edizioni. ISBN 88-85331-08-4.
