= Mystic Marriage of Saint Catherine (Spinello Aretino) =

Painting by Spinello Aretino

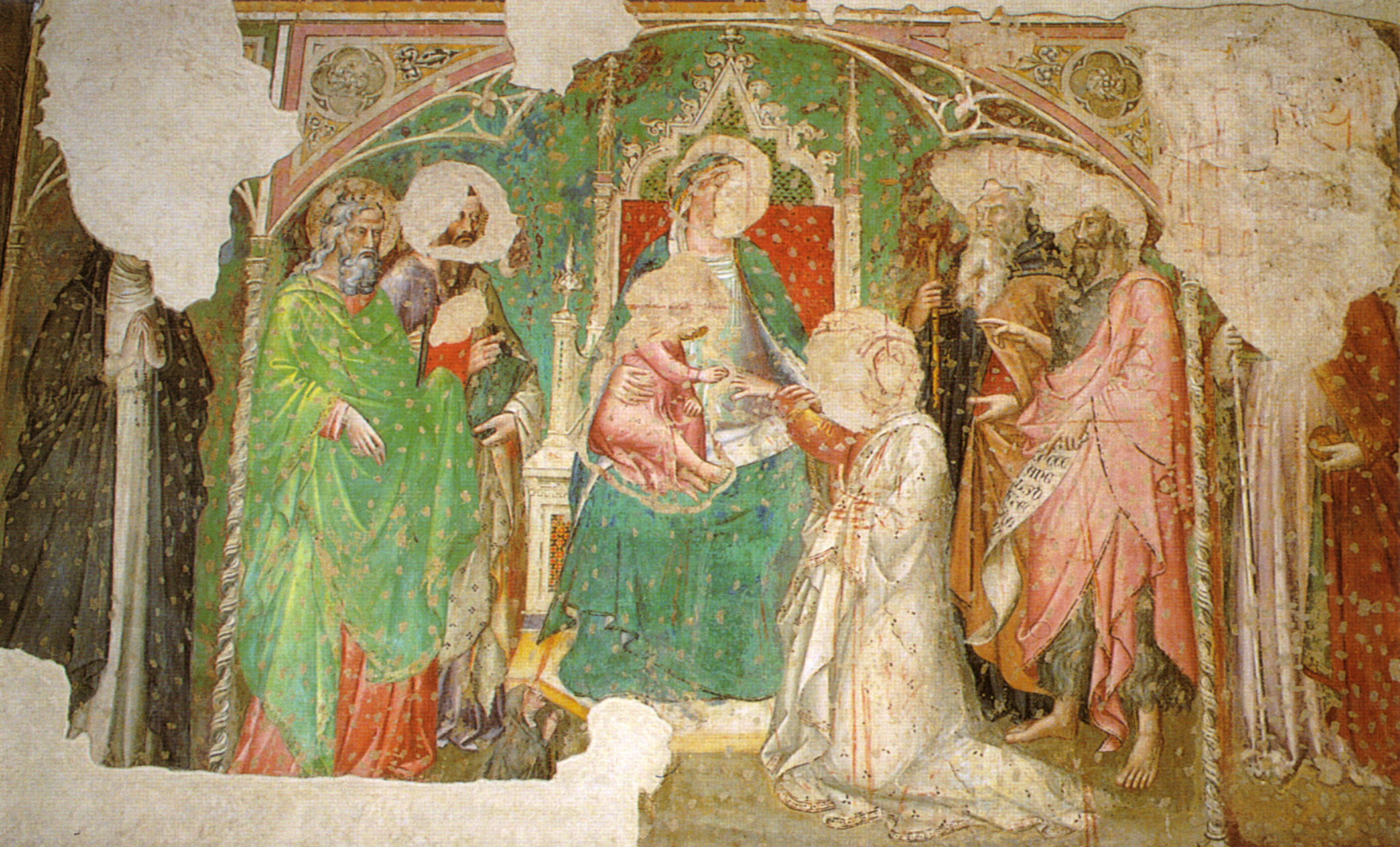

Mystic Marriage of Saint Catherine is a c.1390 fresco fragment by Spinello Aretino. It was originally discovered in the Bartolini Salimbeni Chapel with the sinopia below Lorenzo Monaco's frescoes in 1961 and is now in the nearby Cialli-Seringi Chapel in Santa Trinita in Florence.

The central scene shows the Mystic Marriage of Saint Catherine flanked by saints Andrew, Bartholomew (protector of Salimbeni and of the Bartolini in general), Anthony the Great and John the Baptist. It is flanked by two smaller arches, with Saint Elizabeth (left) and a bishop saint (right).
