= Descent into Limbo (Beccafumi) =

Painting by Domenico Beccafumi

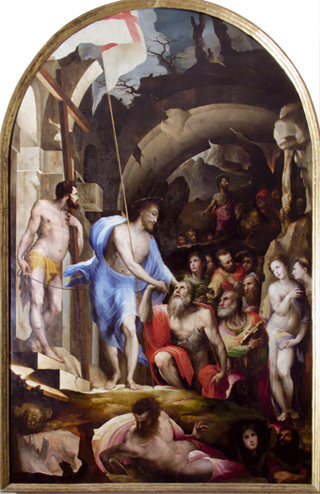
Descent into Limbo (c. 1530–1535) by Domenico Beccafumi

Descent into Limbo or Descent into Hell is an oil-on-panel painting executed c. 1530–1535 by the Italian Renaissance painter Domenico Beccafumi, now in the Sienese Grand Masters room in the Pinacoteca Nazionale in Siena. With the Saint Martin Nativity and Holy Family with the Infant John the Baptist it is one of the last works commissioned from the artist by the Beccafumi Marsili family for their family chapel at the Basilica of San Francesco in Siena. Damaged by a fire in 1655, the painting was seen by Giorgio Vasari, who praised it for the uniqueness of its figures, prefiguring Mannerism.

It shows Christ descending to the souls in Limbo, including Adam in the centre, a nude Eve to the right and between them King David holding a lyre. In the far background John the Baptist guides the souls, whilst at the bottom is a river divinity. To the left is a figure holding a cross, possibly Dismas the good thief, for whom a preparatory head study is in the Morgan Library and Museum. A preparatory drawing and a sketch for the whole work are both now in the Uffizi, whilst another is in the Metropolitan Museum of Art.
