= Annunciation (Lorenzetti) =

1344 painting by Ambrogio Lorenzetti

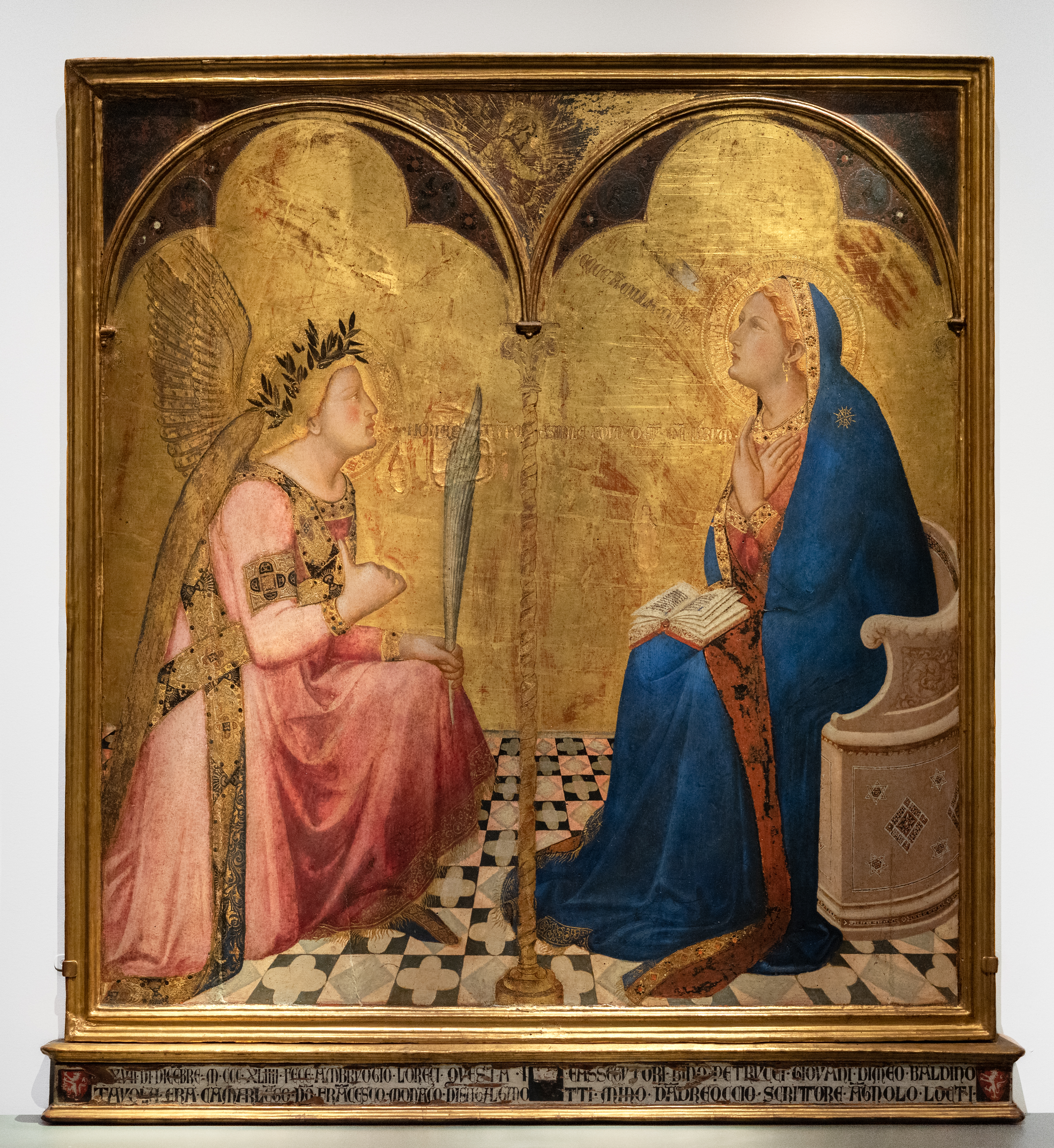
- Artist: Ambrogio Lorenzetti
- Year: 1344
- Type: Tempera and gold on panel
- Dimensions: 127 cm × 120 cm (50 in × 47 in)
- Location: Pinacoteca Nazionale; Siena

The Annunciation is a painting by the Italian late medieval painter Ambrogio Lorenzetti, signed and dated 1344, now housed in the Pinacoteca Nazionale of Siena. It was painted for the Ufficio della Gabella ("Office of the Tax") of the commune of Siena, as specified by two-line signature at the bottom (the painter named himself Ambruogio Lorenzi). It was originally located in the Consistory Hall of the Palazzo Pubblico.

== Description ==
Lorenzetti chose for his painting an unusual moment of the Annunciation of Mary: the moment in which the angel (according to the Gospel of Luke) explains her how the conception could happen, and in which the conception itself occurs. The angel, in fact, is saying the Latin words: Non est (erit) impossibile apud Deum omne verbum ("Nothing is impossible for God's word"), which are visible between his mouth and the Virgin's chest. The Virgin, looking upwards, replies: Ecce Ancilla Domini ("Here Is God's Maid").

The style is that of late Lorenzetti's works (after 1335) executed in Siena. The rather realistic use of geometrical perspective in the pavement is similar to that in the Presentation of Jesus at the Temple (1342). The use of chiaroscuro in the faces and the drapes shows the influence of Giotto, which he had acquired during his stay in Florence (before).

== Sources ==
- Fruogoni, Chiara (2010). Pietro e Ambrogio Lorenzetti. Florence: Le Lettere. ISBN 978-88-7166-668-6.
