= Madonna and Child with Saints Polyptych =

Painting by Duccio di Buoninsegna

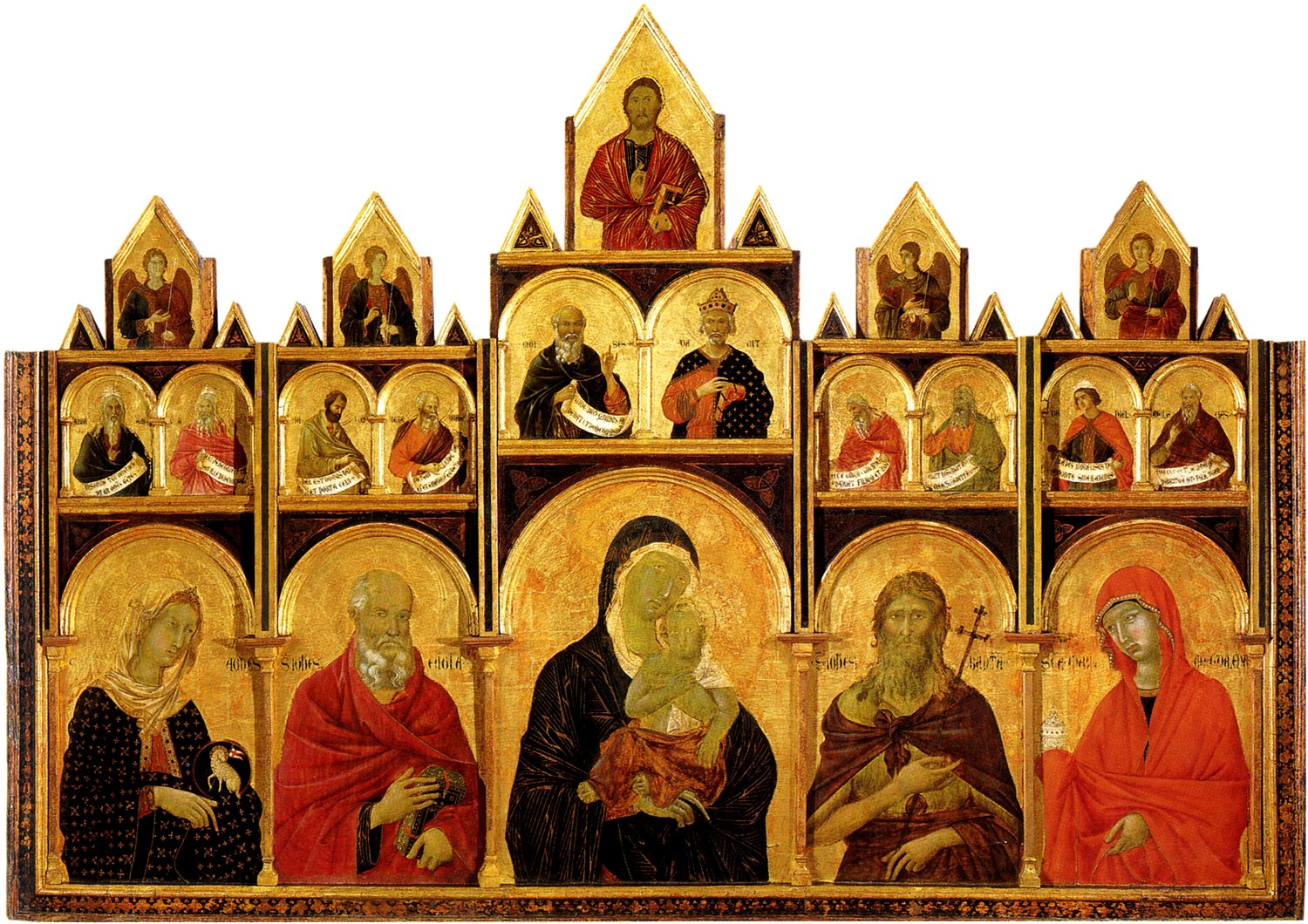
Madonna and Child with Saints, Duccio

The Madonna and Child with Saints Polyptych is a five-piece Madonna polyptych by Italian Renaissance artist Duccio di Buoninsegna, also referred to as Polyptych no. 47 by Duccio.

The bright colors and gold used in the work typify Duccio's usual style. Above the Madonna, Child and four saints, the polyptych depicts ten patriarchs and prophets. At the apex stands Christ, flanked by four angels positioned slightly below him. Among the saints depicted are Agnes, John the Evangelist, John the Baptist, and Mary Magdalene.

It was painted between 1311 and 1318, or possibly 1305 to 1310, (tempera and gold on wood) and is located at the Pinacoteca Nazionale in Siena, Italy.

== See also ==
- Roman Catholic Marian art
