= Mystic Marriage of Saint Catherine (Parmigianino, Louvre) =

Painting by Parmigianino

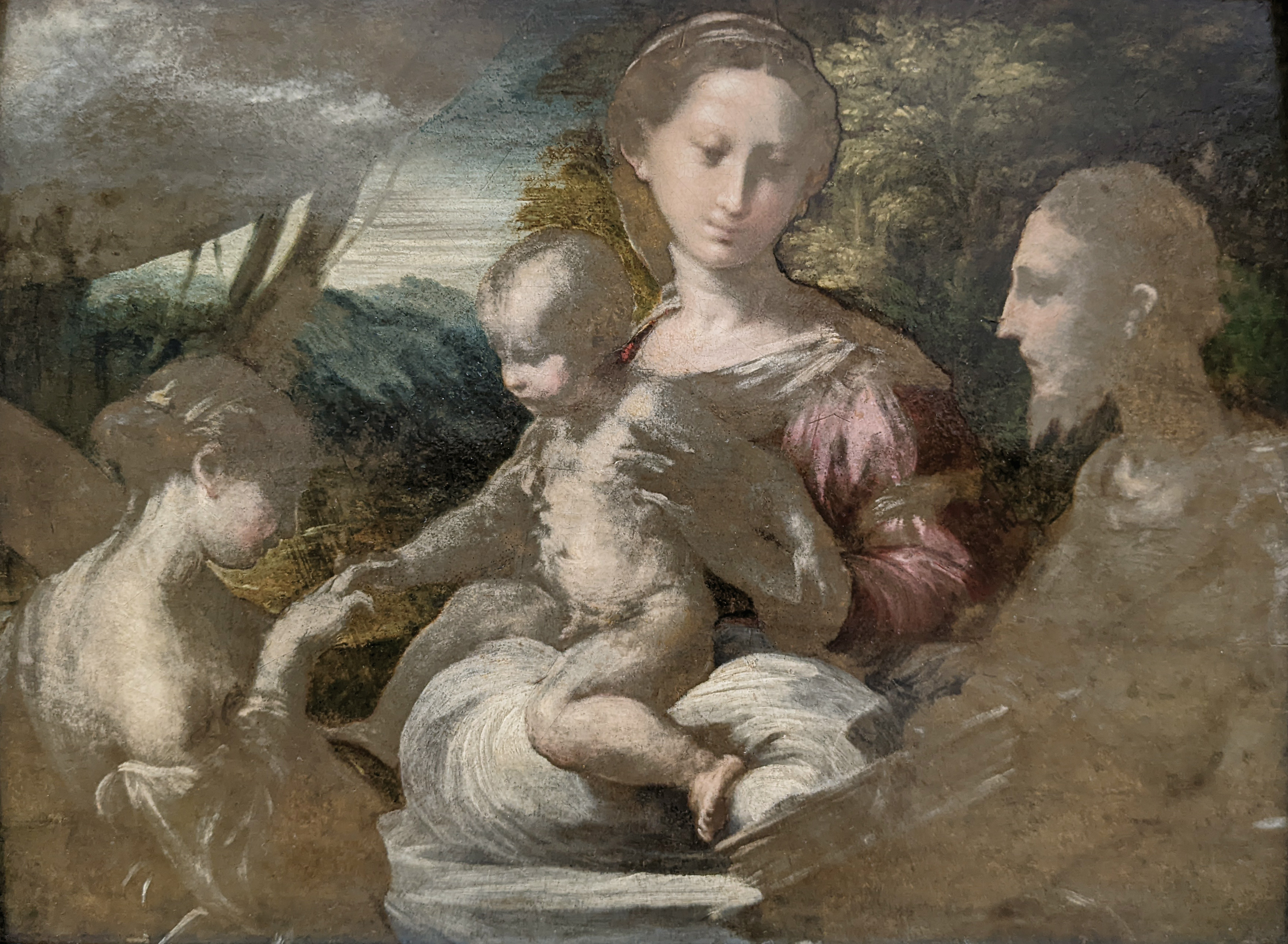
- Artist: Parmigianino
- Year: c.1529
- Medium: oil on panel
- Dimensions: 20 cm × 27 cm (7.9 in × 11 in)
- Location: Louvre, Paris

Mystic Marriage of Saint Catherine is an unfinished c.1529 oil on panel painting of the mystical marriage of Saint Catherine by Parmigianino.

It dates to the painter's time in Bologna or a few years earlier during his stay in Rome. From 1638 to 1687 it was owned by don Gaspar Mendez de Haroy Guzman, the Spanish ambassador to Rome, before passing to Giovanni Battista Sommariva. It was acquired in 1823 by Frédéric Reiset and then in 1992 by its current owner the Louvre, as a gift from the Société des amis du Louvre.

Three copies of it are known in the Pushkin Museum in Moscow, in the Campori collection in Modena and one in a private collection sold at Phillips in London on 19 April 1994.

== Sources ==
- (in Italian) Mario Di Giampaolo ed Elisabetta Fadda, Parmigianino, Keybook, Santarcangelo di Romagna 2002. ISBN 8818-02236-9
- "Catalogue page" (in French).
