= Mystical Marriage of St Catherine and Saints (Lotto) =

1524 painting by Lorenzo Lotto

Mystic Marriage of St Catherine and Saints
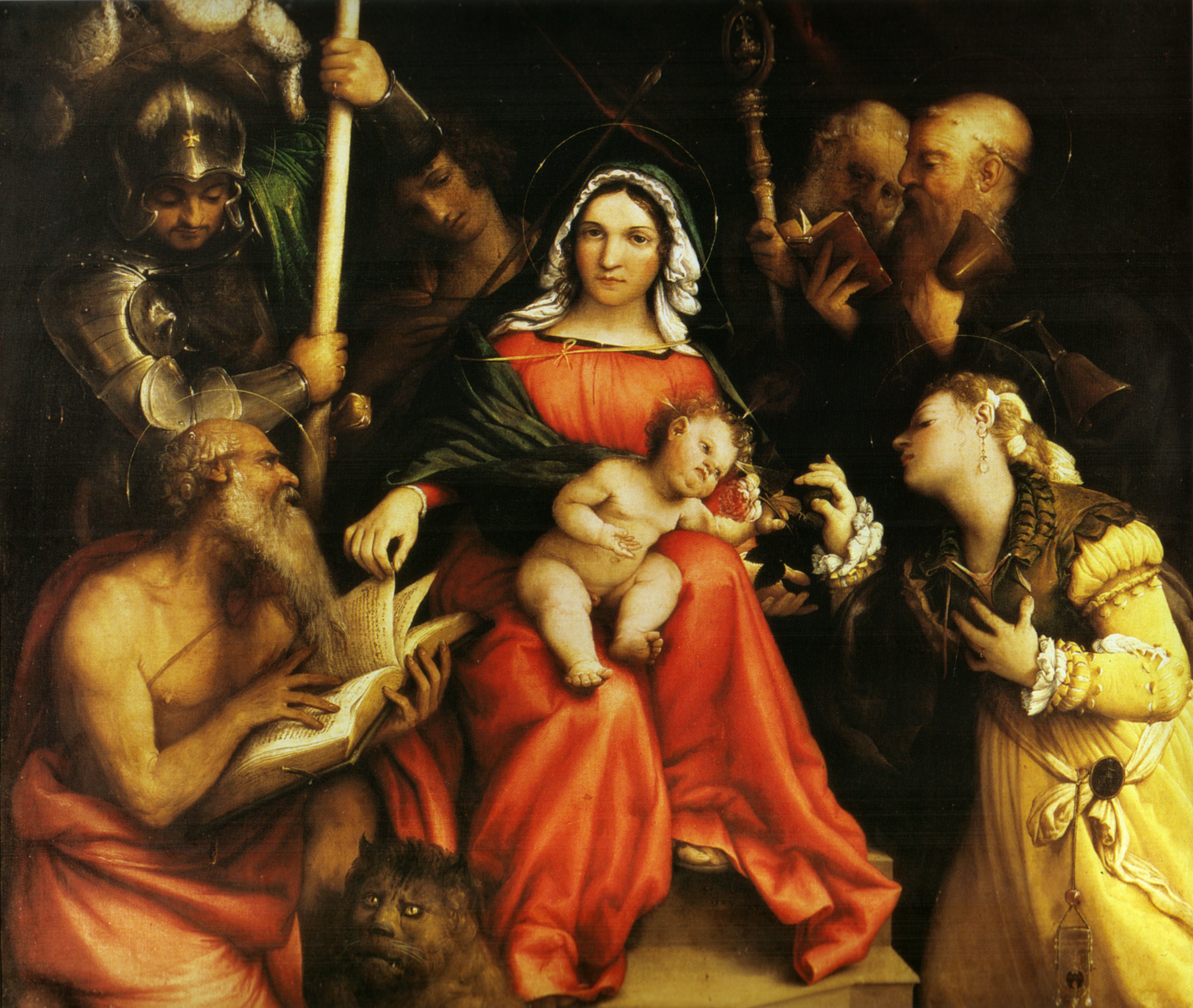
- Artist: Lorenzo Lotto
- Year: 1524
- Medium: Oil on panel
- Dimensions: 115 cm × 98 cm (45 in × 39 in)
- Location: Galleria Nazionale d'Arte Antica, Rome

Mystical Marriage of St Catherine and Saints is an oil-on-panel painting by Lorenzo Lotto, signed and dated 1524, now in the Collections of the Galleria Nazionale d'Arte Antica (Palazzo Barberini), Rome, Italy.

== Description ==
The work was commissioned by the merchant Felice Cassotti from Lotto while the latter was working in Bergamo. The painting hung in the nuptial bedroom of Cassotti's son. The work is signed on the Madonna's throne. The painting once hung in the Palazzo Quirinale.

Lotto in 1523 had painted a portrait of the married couple, Marsilio Cassotti and Faustina Assonica, a work now in the Prado Museum. In this depiction of the mystical marriage of Saint Catherine of Alexandria, the saint kneeling accepts from the child Jesus a rose, the latter symbol of love and martyrdom; in her left hand is a marital ring. Hanging from a sash is a purse with the name of Christ; the sash has a medallion with an angel holding a balance. Around these figures are St Jerome paging his bible, with lion at the feet (left lower corner); St George dressed as a knight with his lance (left upper corner); beside him hovering behind the Virgin is St Sebastian with an arrow; Saint Nicholas of Myra with a bishop's crozier with three gold spheres, conversing with St Anthony Abbot with bells (right upper corner). Like many other Lotto paintings, the figures seem engaged in movement.
