= Mystic Marriage of Saint Catherine (Moroni) =

Painting by Giovanni Battista Moroni

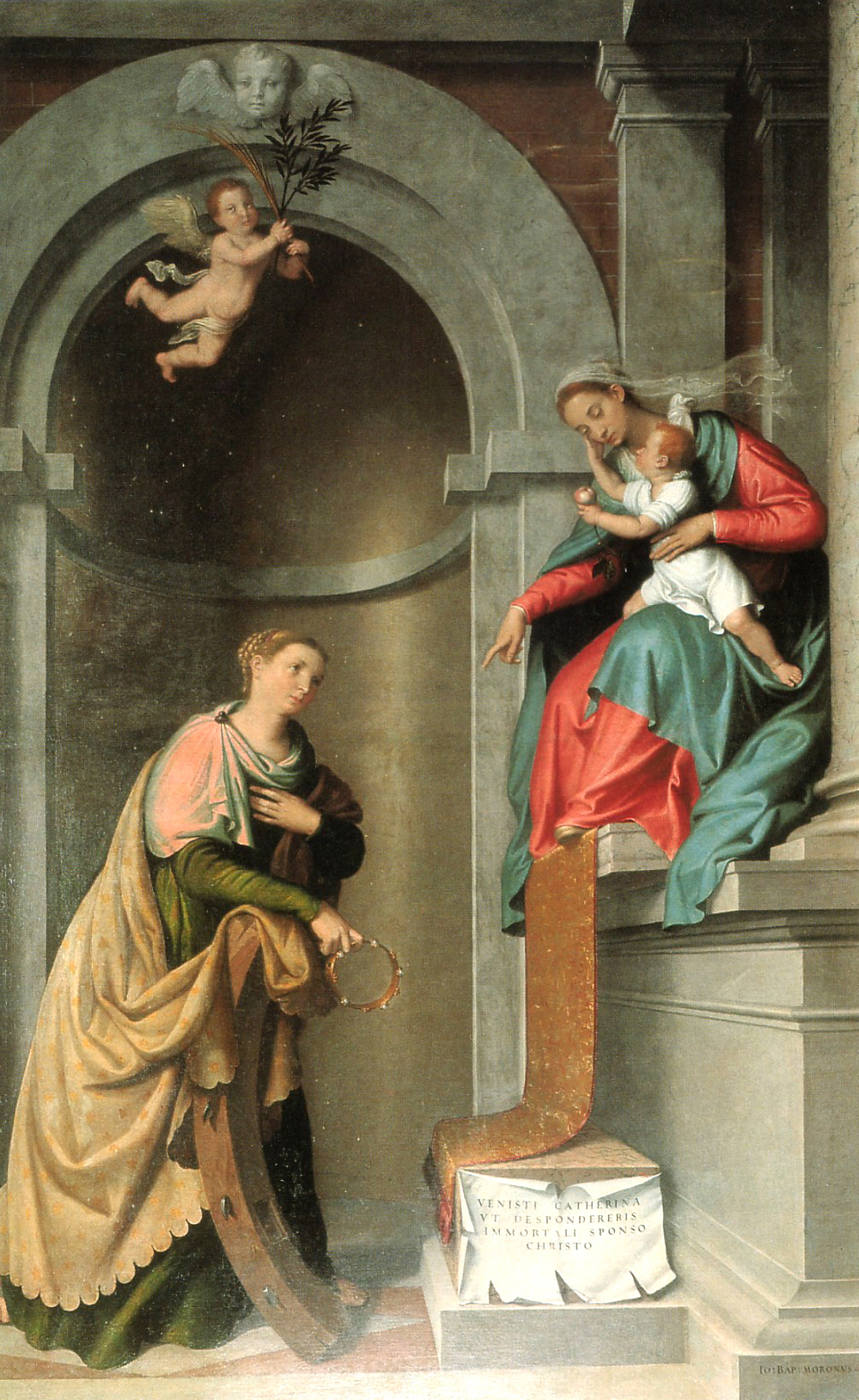
- Artist: Giovanni Battista Moroni
- Year: 1567-1570
- Medium: oil on panel
- Dimensions: 228 cm × 148 cm (90 in × 58 in)
- Location: Church of San Bartolomeo, Almenno San Bartolomeo

Mystic Marriage of Saint Catherine or Mystic Betrothal of Saint Catherine is a 1567-1570 oil on panel painting by Giovanni Battista Moroni, produced for the side-altar of Catherine of Alexandria in the church of San Bartolomeo, parish church of Almenno San Bartolomeo, where it still hangs. It is signed at lower right IO:BAP.MORONUS.P. The church had been begun in 1520 through the will of Giorgio Rota, but work lapsed until restarting in 1562. The painting draws on the composition of Moretti's 1539 Rovelli Altarpiece.

The altarpiece's presence can be deduced from Carlo Borromeo's visit in 1575. The altar on which it stood was built on the wishes of Francesco Lisotti for a weekly mass for his soul, probably towards the end of the church's construction. This suggests a dating in the late 1560s, as do the facial features of the Madonna, similar to those of the 1567 altarpiece for the Santa Maria della Ripa Monastery in Desenzano al Serio. However, in 1931 Andrea Pinotti places it closer to the artist's 1564-1567 altarpiece for the parish church of San Pietro in Parre.

It is placed slightly later by Gregori, on the basis of the architectural background, which he argues tends towards the Cremonese school, and similarities between the folds of the female saint's mantle and of those of the apostles in his Last Supper in the church at Romano di Lombardia
