= Michelino da Besozzo =

Italian painter

Michelino Molinari da Besozzo
- Born: 1370
- Died: 1455 (aged 84–85)
- Known for: Painter and illuminator
- Style: Trecento
- Movement: Lombard School

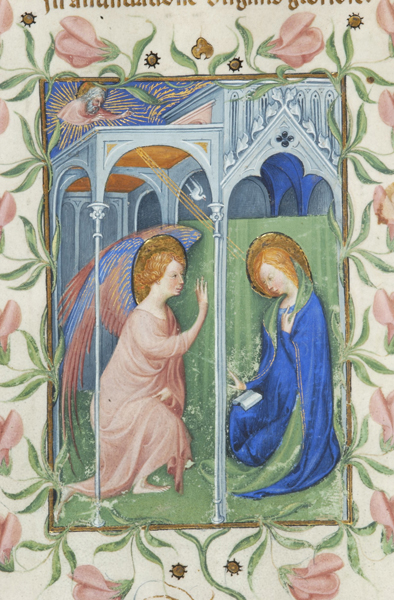
Page from Libro d'Oro depicting the Annunciation

Michelino Molinari da Besozzo (c. 1370 – c. 1455) was a notable fifteenth-century Italian painter and illuminator, who was widely praised for his work. He worked mostly in Milan and Lombardy and was employed by the Visconti family, rulers of Milan. Michelino's work follows the traditions of the Lombard School and maintains the Trecento style.

== Personal life ==
Michelino was born in 1388 and died sometime after 1450. It is believed that he is referred to in some documents from the period by the name Michele da Pavia, as he lived in Pavia at the beginning of his career, where he left some frescoes inside the Visconti Castle. Michelino lived in Milan from 1439 until his death, where he worked for the Viscontis, rulers of Milan. When his patron, the first Duke of Milan Gian Galeazzo Visconti, died and Giovanni Maria Visconti came to power, Michelino moved to Venice and Vicenza to avoid Giovanni's difficult reign. In Venice, Michelino was in contact with painter Gentile da Fabriano (Gentile di Niccolò di Massio).

Michelino had a son, Leonardo, who was also a manuscript illuminator and worked between 1428 and 1488. Leonardo’s work includes notable frescoes that remain in the church of San Giovanni a Carbonara in Naples, Italy.

== Career ==
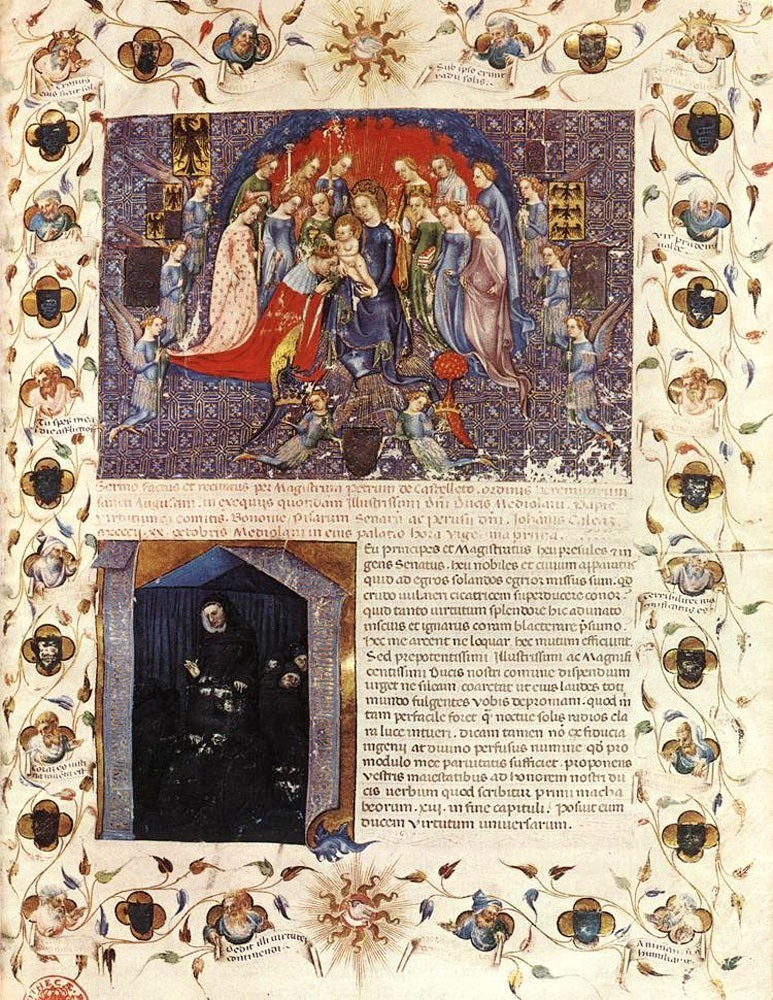
Michelino Molinari da Besozzo, Eulogy for Giangaleazzo Visconti, 1402-1403, 14.5 x 9.5 in (37.5 x 24 in), Bibliothèque Nationale, ms. lat. 5888, fol. 1, Paris

As a fifteenth-century Italian artist of the Lombard School, Michelino’s illuminations follow a linear form of the International Gothic Style and are abstract, yet appear to be naturalistic because of the detailed nature of the artist’s work. Though few of his works have survived to the present day, Michelino was among the most famous artists of his day and was widely acclaimed and praised. Remaining examples of Michelino’s work deny the classicizing style of the Renaissance, instead maintaining the more rigid forms of the outdated, Gothic style of the Proto-Renaissance. Michelino's career was most relevant during his time in Milan, where he worked for the Visconti family. Michelino was given major commissions in Milan and was notably employed to design windows for the Visconti’s cathedral.

=== Eulogy for Giangaleazzo Visconti ===
In 1404, Michelino created miniature illuminations for the funeral oration of his patron, Gian Galeazzo Visconti. These miniatures are now owned by the Bibliothèque Nationale in Paris. The text of this Eulogy for Giangaleazzo Visconti was commissioned by the Visconti court and written by an Augustinian friar, Pietro da Castelletto. Michelino's illuminations of the text include delicate garlands of flowers that surround Pietro da Castelletto's text. Michelino's illuminations also feature details such as a cloth of honour with both imperial and Viscoti coats of arms. The coats of arms serve as a background for a scene of Pietro's eulogy, which shows Giangaleazzo's coronation, performed by the Christ Child, who is shown as larger than all other figures in the work. Other scenes include Pietro da Castelletto as he addresses Augustinians from his pulpit. The Eulogy for Giangaleazzo Visconti also includes Michelino's illuminations of a complete genealogy of the Visconti family, which Michelino defines through profile depictions that draw from Greco-Roman coins and medals. The genealogy traces the Viscontis back to the marriage of Trojan prince Anchises and the goddess Venus, which was allegedly performed by Jupiter. Michelino represents Anchises, Venus, and Jupiter as 15th-century Florentine nobility. The references to antiquity in this work imply humanism at the Visconti court, even as they take on a medieval appearance through Michelino's work. This work is similar to art from the Valois court in France, and therefore appealed to the royal focus of the Visconti family and their desire for dynastic power through marriage. The detailed and refined nature of this work and its similarity to the work of the Valois court highlight why Michelino's work was so appealing to the aristocracy.

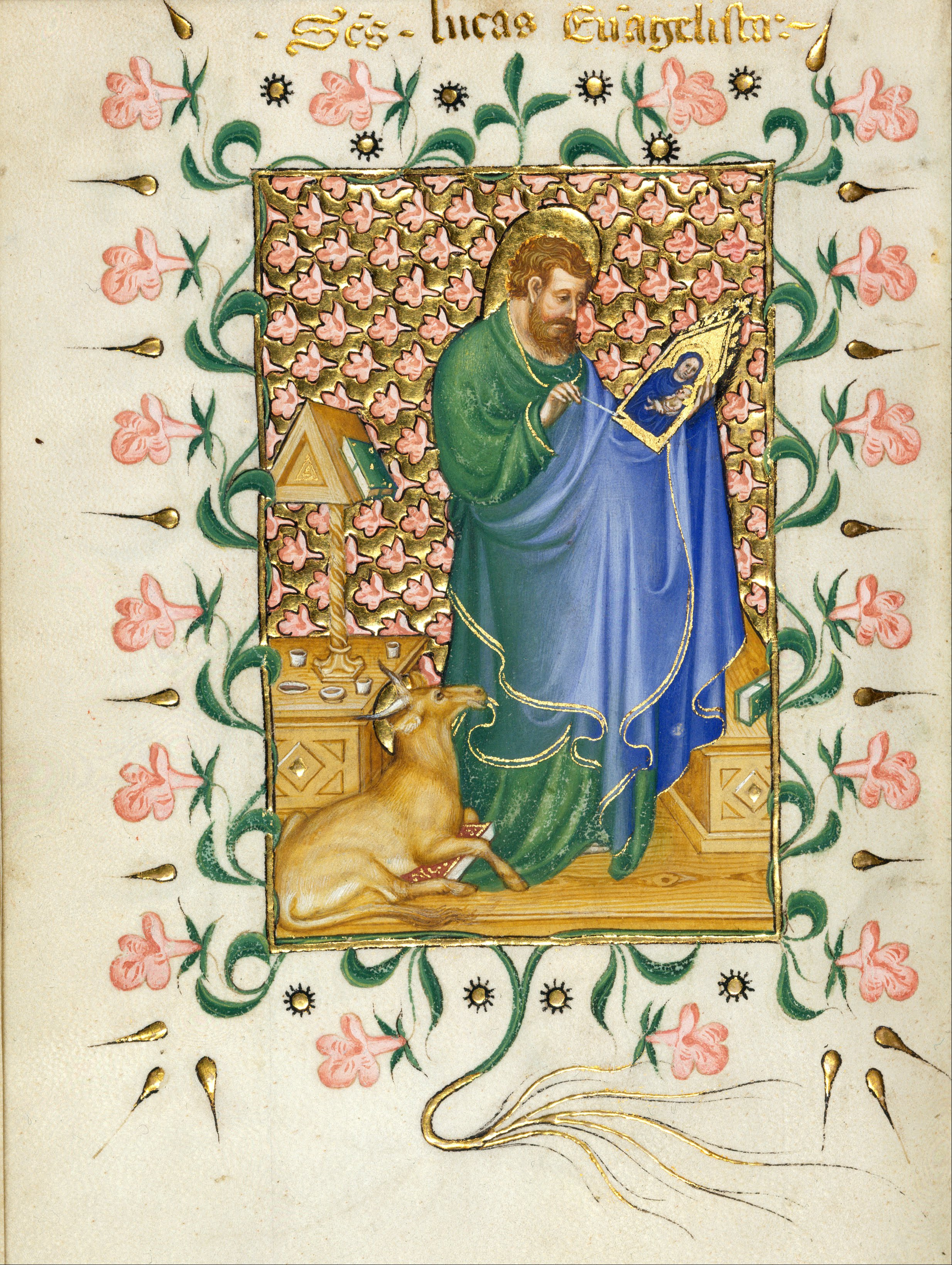
St. Luke Painting the Virgin, Michelino Molinari da Besozzo, Prayer Book in Latin, Milan, ca. 1420, 170 x 120 mm

=== St. Luke Painting the Virgin ===
St. Luke Painting the Virgin is an illumination from a small Latin prayer book from 1420, which currently resides in the collection of the Morgan Library and Museum. This prayer book holds the majority of Michelino’s existing work, and its text, consisting of 47 prayers, was written in dark brown ink by a single scribe. The book, now bound with 19th-century velvet with silver clasps, includes 22 full-page illuminations with floral borders; however, half of the original miniature illuminations are now missing. The illumination of St. Luke Painting the Virgin depicts St. Luke finishing painting a panel of the Virgin and Child and is among the first Western representations of this scene. Later in the 15th century and throughout the remainder of the Italian Renaissance this subject became increasingly popular, for St. Luke was the patron saint of painters and painters’ guilds. Throughout the 15th, 16th, and 17th centuries, artists continued to propagate saintly artistic creation by showing St. Luke painting the Madonna and Child. Michelino's version features St. Luke standing as he works on a gable-topped panel, while in Georgio Vasari's 1565 fresco of the scene that resides in the church of Santissima Annuciata, St. Luke paints a portrait of an other-worldly sitter, who is also captured in Vasari's painting.

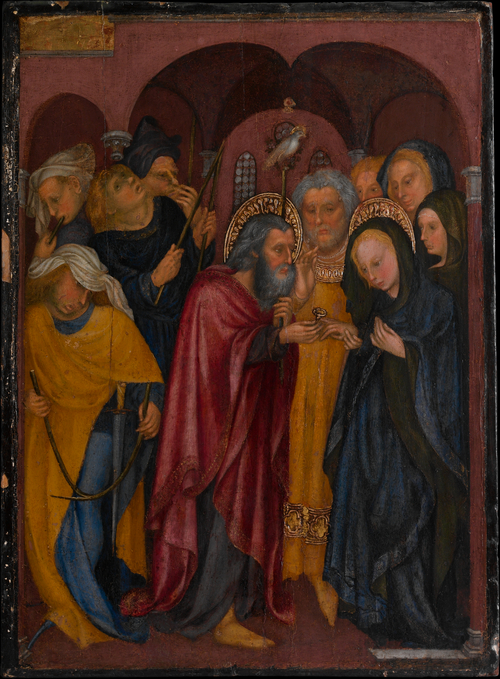
Michelino da Besozzo, The Marriage of the Virgin, ca. 1430, tempera and gold on wood, 25 5/8 x 18 3/4 in. (65.1 x 47.6 cm), Metropolitan Museum of Art

=== Maturity ===
Michelino's 1410 visit to Venice was incredibly significant to the overall development of Venetian painting in the following two decades. Both Venice and Vicenza appreciated and lauded Michelino's delicate style. Other notable works include Mystic Marriage of St. Catherine, which is now located in the Pinacoteca in Siena. This small painting depicts the marriage between St. Catherine and Christ. Mystic Marriage of St. Catherine and the Marriage of the Virgin are the only two works (both panel paintings) that can definitively be attributed to Michelino. Marriage of the Virgin is owned by the Metropolitan Museum of Art in New York City, and now has a damaged surface. This work, made from tempera on wood with raised gold ornament, depicts an elderly Joseph presenting a young and timid Virgin with a ring. The humour found in the expressions of the surrounding rejected men highlights Michelino's skill through his ability to inject movement into the scene with expression. Marriage of the Virgin mirrors the crowded composition of Michelino's work with illuminated manuscripts; furthermore, the curvilinear forms in the work are emblematic of the International Gothic Style.

== Legacy and significance ==
Michelino was given great recognition for his work and skill during his lifetime and after, and is largely unknown today because so few of his works have survived. Humanist Umberto Decembrio called Michelino “the most distinguished artist of our time.” Contemporaries referred to Michelino as the "supreme painter." Furthermore, the Duke of Berry sent an agent to interview Michelino, who reported that Michelino was “the most excellent painter among all the painters in the world.”

== Major works ==
- Mystical Marriage of St Catherine, 1420 (Pinacoteca, Siena)
- St. Luke Painting the Virgin (Morgan Library and Museum, New York)
- Marriage of the Virgin (Metropolitan Museum of Art, New York)
- Fragment of a Historiated Initial from a Choir Book: Christ in Majesty, 1400 (Cleveland Museum of Art, Cleveland)
- Eulogy for Giangaleazzo Visconti, 1403 (Bibliothèque Nationale, Paris)
