= Mystic Marriage of Saint Catherine (Andrea del Sarto) =

Painting by Andrea del Sarto

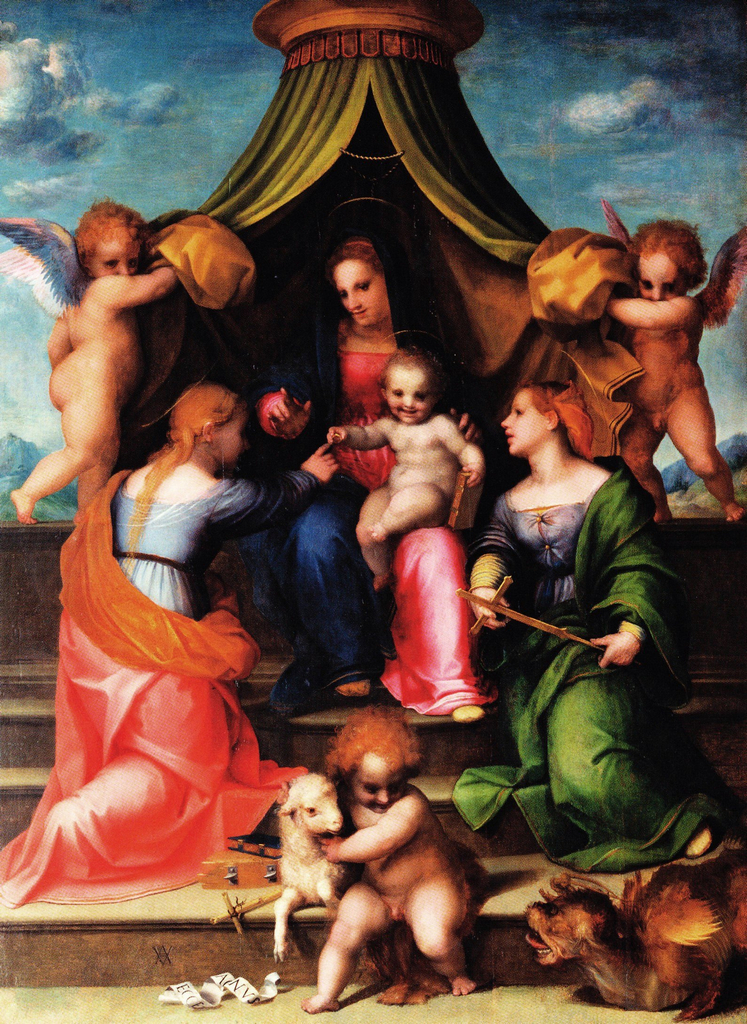
Mystic Marriage of Saint Catherine (c. 1512–1513) by Andrea del Sarto

Mystic Marriage of Saint Catherine of Alexandria is an oil-on-panel painting of the sacra conversazione genre, executed c. 1512–1513 by the Italian Renaissance artist Andrea del Sarto. It was acquired by the imperial gallery in Prague in 1749 and now is in the Gemäldegalerie in Dresden, Germany.

The work was produced during an early phase of the artist's work, contemporary with his frescoes in the Chiostrino dei Voti in Santissima Annunziata, Florence, and was a major influence on his principal pupils, especially Rosso Fiorentino and Pontormo.
