= Archangel Michael in Christian art =

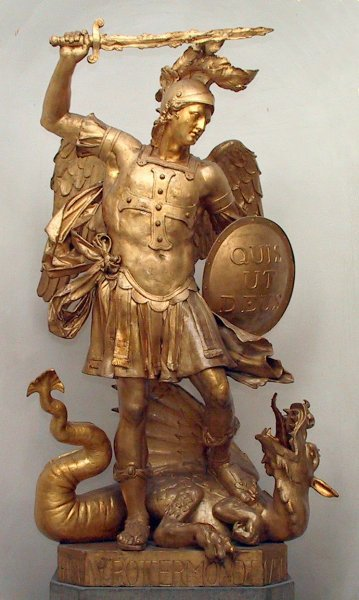
Statue of Archangel Michael at the University of Bonn, slaying Satan as a dragon. Quis ut Deus is inscribed on his shield.

Archangel Michael may be depicted in Christian art alone or with other angels such as Gabriel or saints. Some depictions with Gabriel date back to the 8th century, e.g. the stone casket at Notre Dame de Mortain church in France. He is very often present in scenes of the Last Judgement, but few other specific scenes, so most images including him are devotional rather than narrative. The angel who rescues Shadrach, Meshach, and Abednego from the "fiery furnace" in the Book of Daniel Chapter 3 is usually regarded in Christian tradition as Michael; this is sometimes represented in Early Christian art and Eastern Orthodox icons, but rarely in later art of the Western church.

In most depictions Michael is represented as an angelic warrior, fully armed with helmet, sword, and shield, in the style of a Byzantine officer, which is typically found even in Western depictions, though some late-medieval ones have him in contemporary knightly armour. Like other angels, in late-medieval Western art he may have what are known as feather tights, with large feathers over most of his body, as on the Holy Thorn Reliquary. He may be standing over a serpent, a dragon, or the defeated figure of Satan, whom he sometimes pierces with a lance. The iconography of Michael slaying a serpent goes back to the early 4th century, when Emperor Constantine defeated Licinius at the Battle of Adrianople in 324 AD, not far from the Michaelion, a church dedicated to Archangel Michael.

Constantine felt that Licinius was an agent of Satan, and associated him with the serpent described in the Book of Revelation (12:9). After the victory, Constantine commissioned a depiction of himself and his sons slaying Licinius represented as a serpent - a symbolism borrowed from the Christian teachings on the Archangel to whom he attributed the victory. A similar painting, this time with the Archangel Michael himself slaying a serpent then became a major art piece at the Michaelion and eventually lead to the standard iconography of Archangel Michael as a warrior saint.

In other depictions Michael may be holding a pair of scales in which he weighs the souls of the departed and may hold the book of Life (as in the Book of Revelation), to show that he takes part in the judgment. However this form of depiction is less common than the slaying of the dragon. Michelangelo depicted this scene on the altar wall of the Sistine Chapel. The shield may bears the Latin inscription Quis ut Deus.

In Byzantine art Michael was often shown wearing the formal court robes and loros that were worn by the Emperor and his bodyguard on special occasions, rather than as a normal warrior who battled Satan or with scales for weighing souls on the Day of Judgement.

A Victorian English scholar wrote,

[Michael] is always represented by the ecclesiastical Byzantine painters as a young warrior of surpassing beauty, standing on the body of an old dead man, with wings expanded, and holding a flaming sword in his right, and a pair of scales in his left hand, in order to show that with the first he took his soul, and with the second he weighs the good and bad actions which the man had accomplished during his stay on earth.

The widely reproduced image of Our Mother of Perpetual Help, an icon of the Cretan school, depicts Michael on the left carrying the lance and sponge of the crucifixion of Jesus, with Gabriel on the right side of Mary and Jesus.

In Eastern Orthodox depictions, there are three icons of the Archangel Michael in whose composition he is said to have personally intervened: Archangel Michael of Mantamados in Mytilene, Archangel Michael of Panormitis and Archangel Michael of Nenita. Each of these icons is different.

== Gallery of art ==
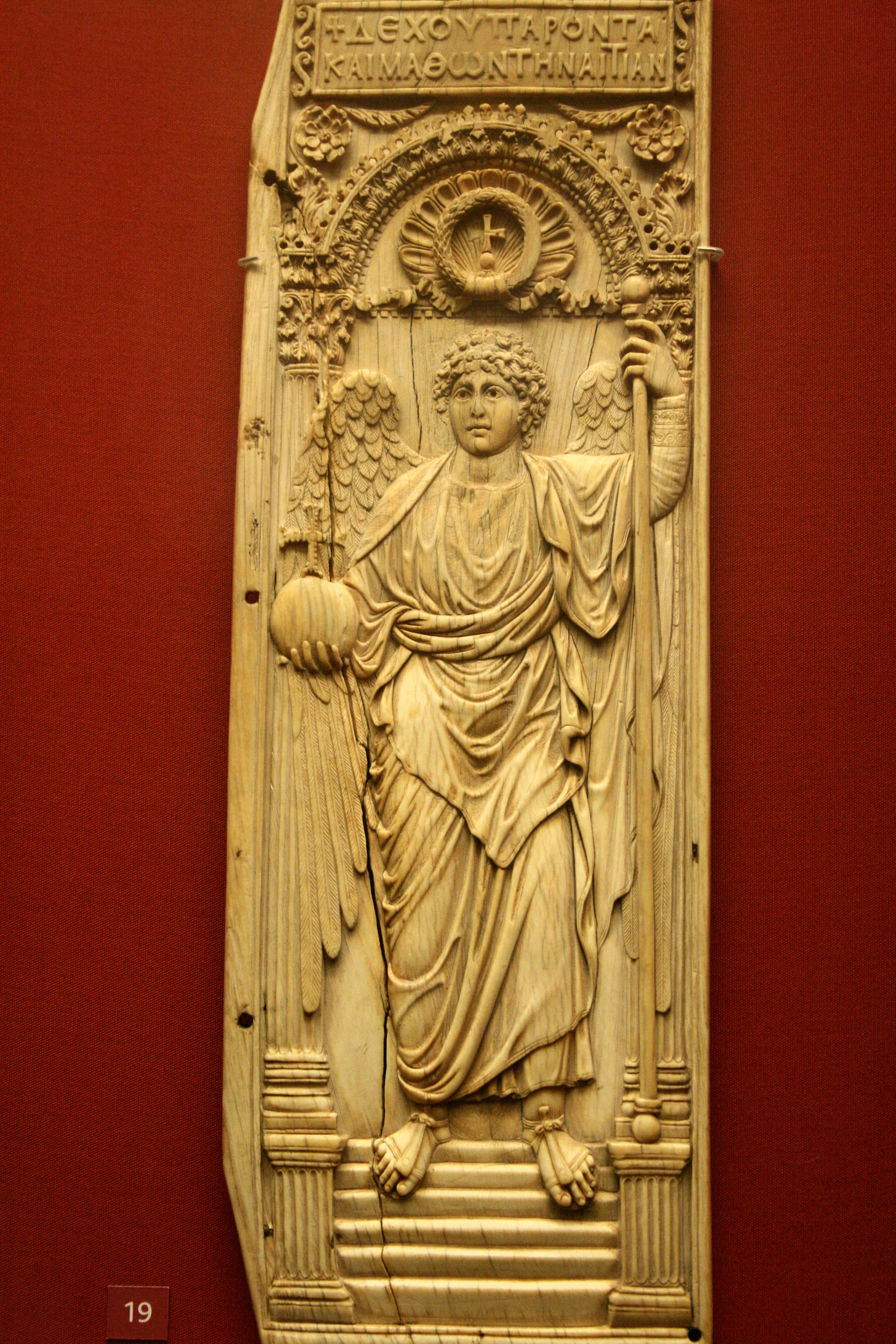
Byzantine ivory, half of a diptych, early 6th century

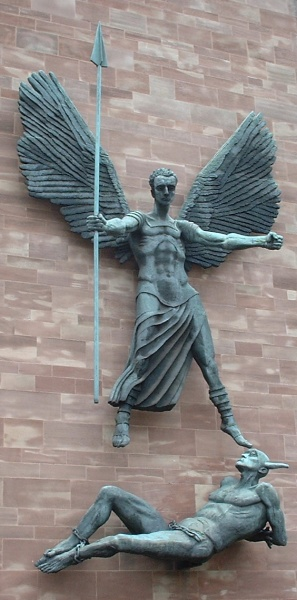
Bronze by Jacob Epstein (1880–1959) at Coventry Cathedral

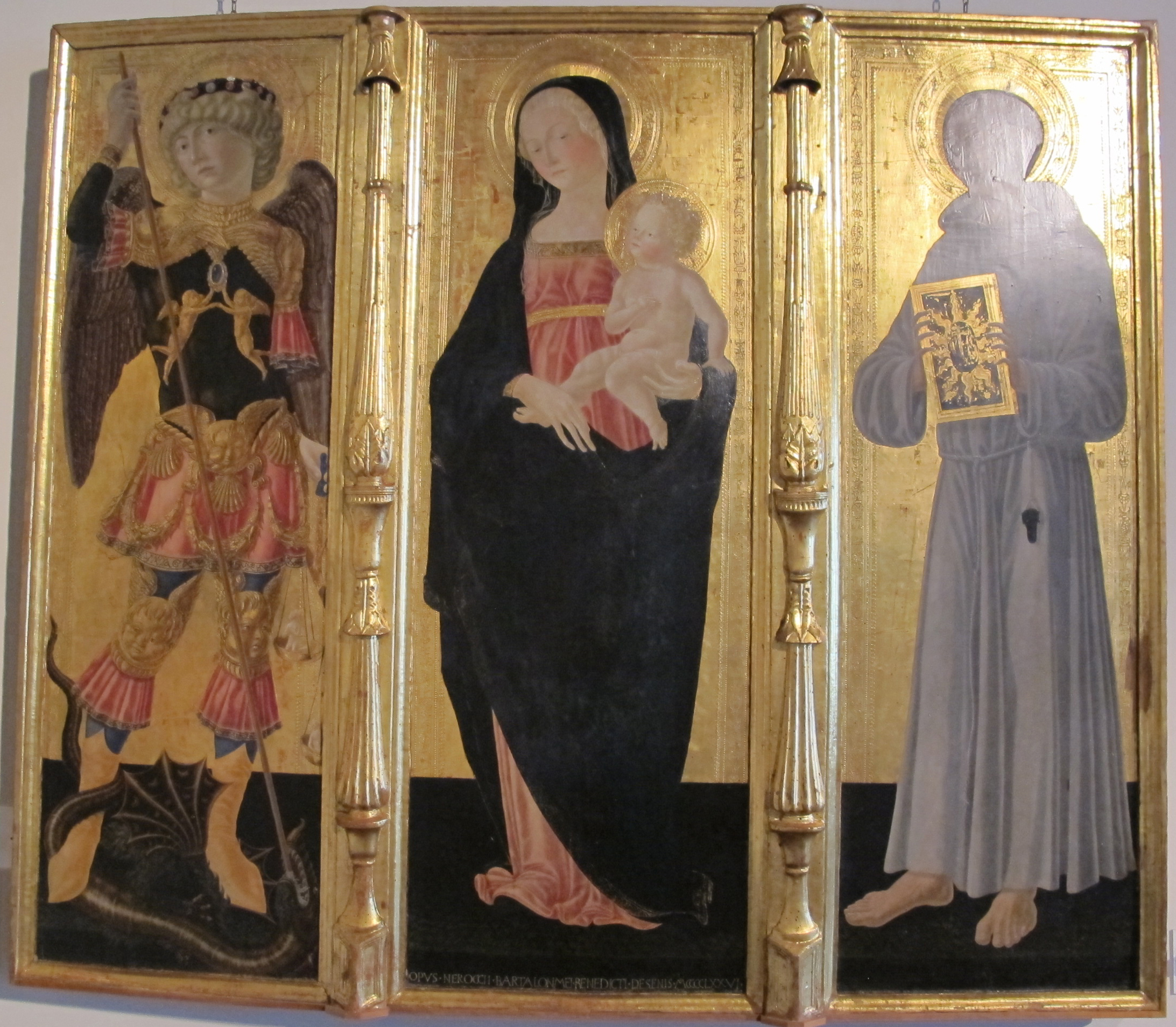
Madonna and Child with St Michael and St Bernardino, Neroccio di Bartolomeo de' Landi, 1476

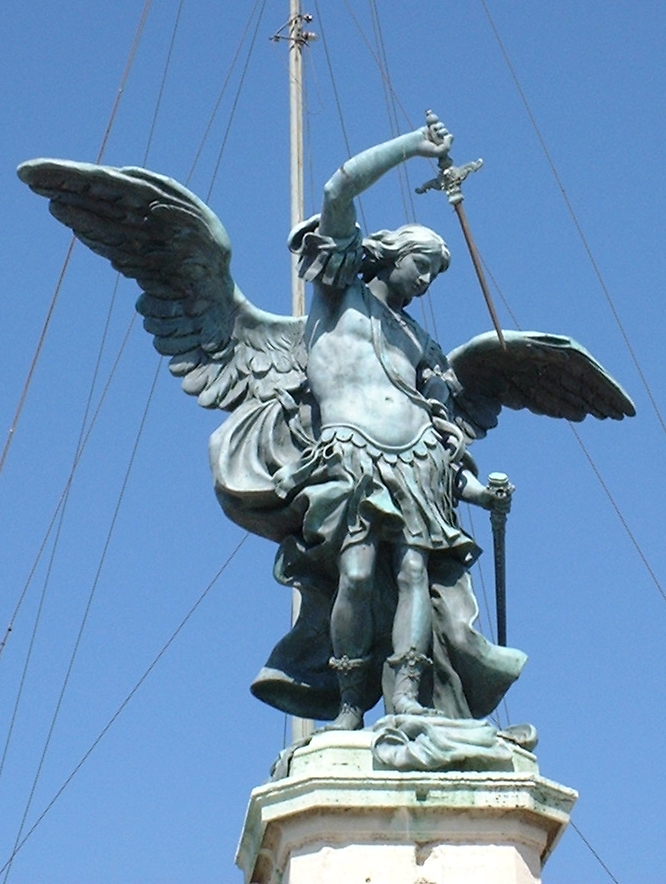
At Castel Sant'Angelo, Rome, 1753

The triumphant St. Michael, Dosso Dossi, 16th century

St. Michael and fallen angels, Rubens, 17th century
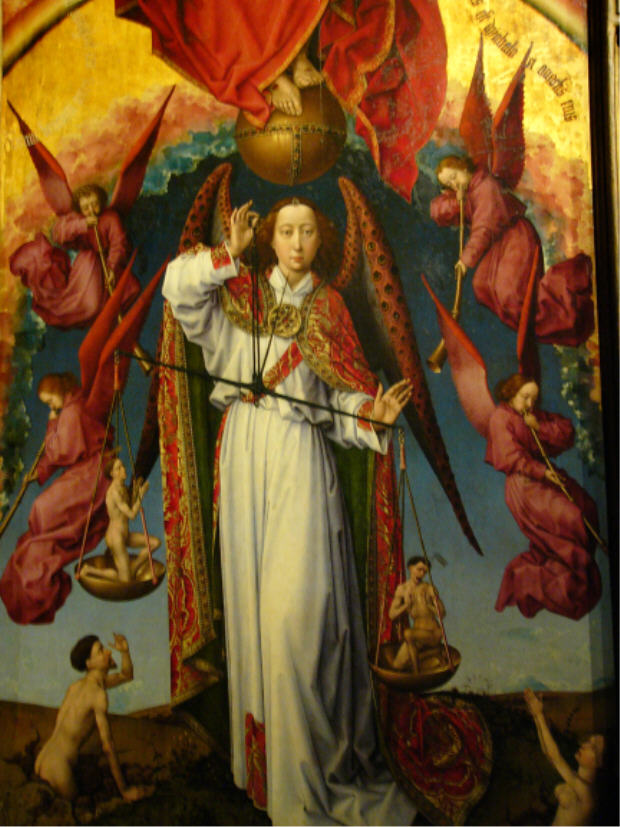
Weighing souls, from a 15th-century Last Judgement

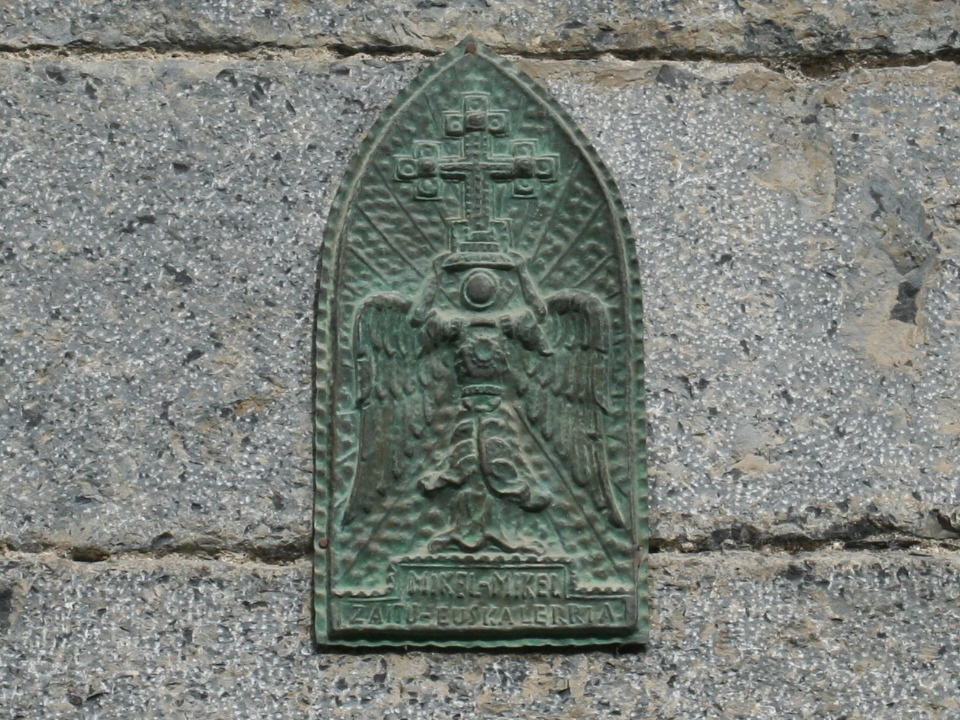
A customary depiction of Michael the Archangel in Basque iconography

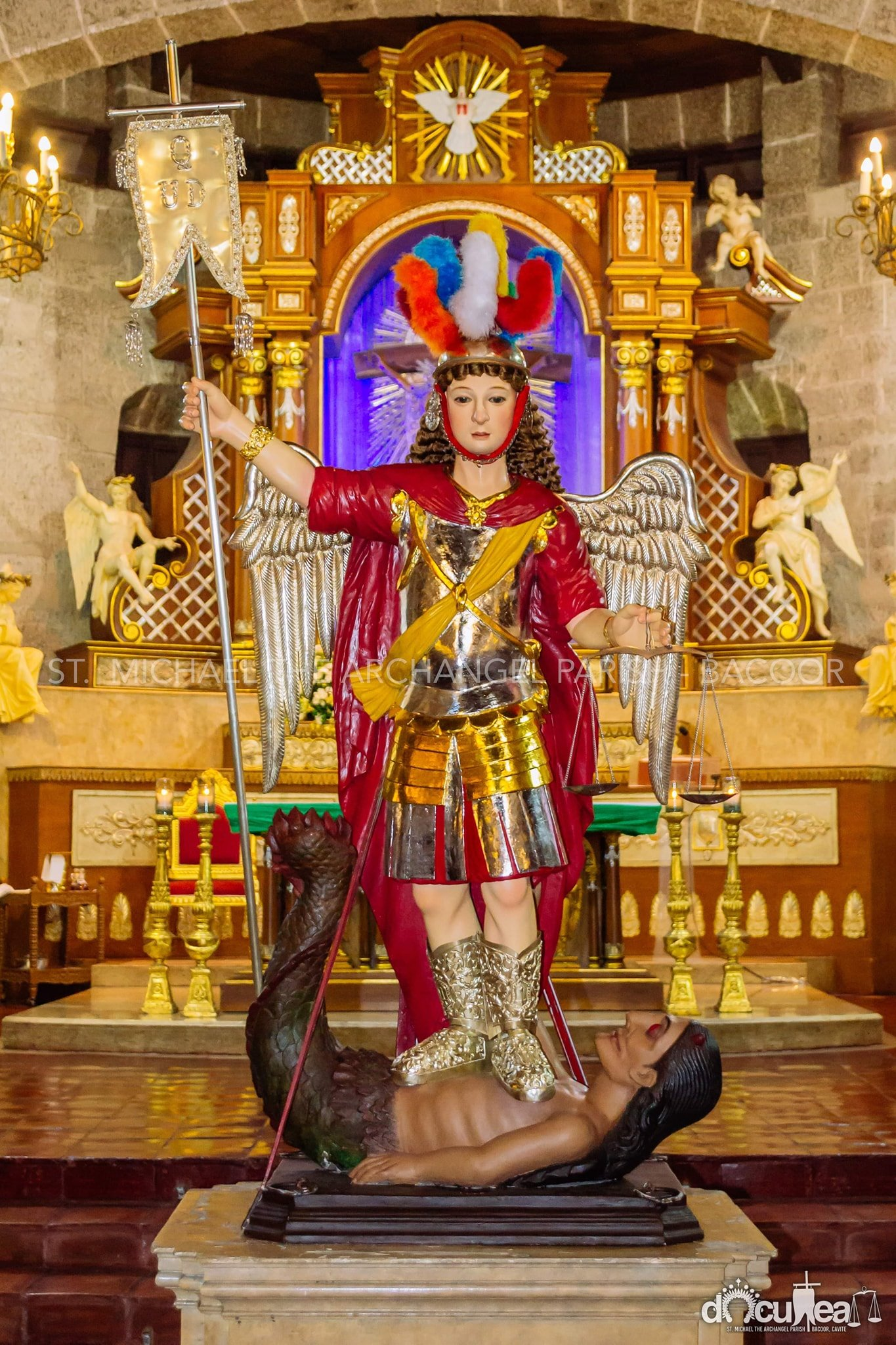
St. Michael the Archangel, patron of Bacoor, Cavite, Philippines, 18th century

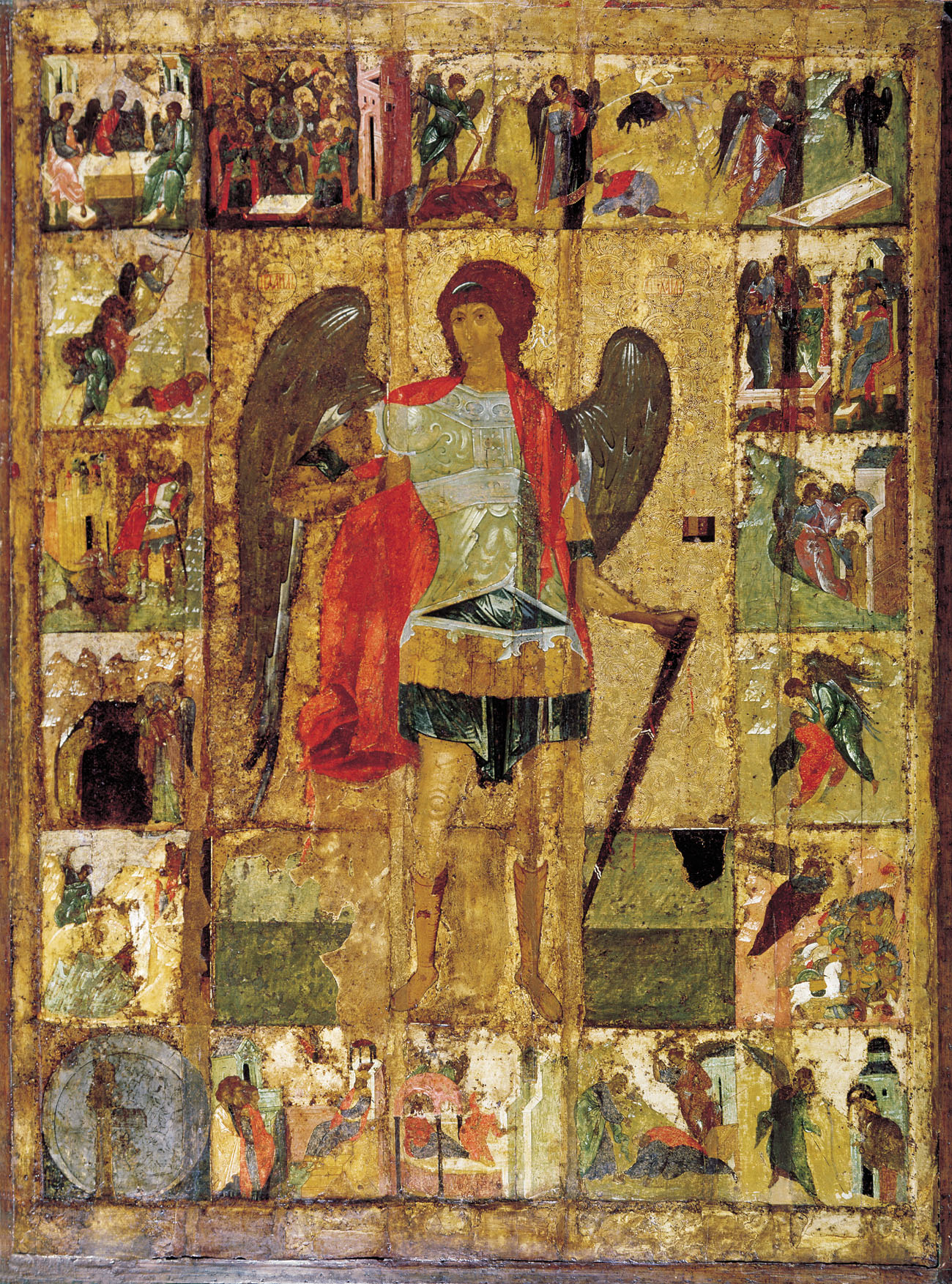
Michael the Archangel and biblical scenes, Russian icon, c. 1410

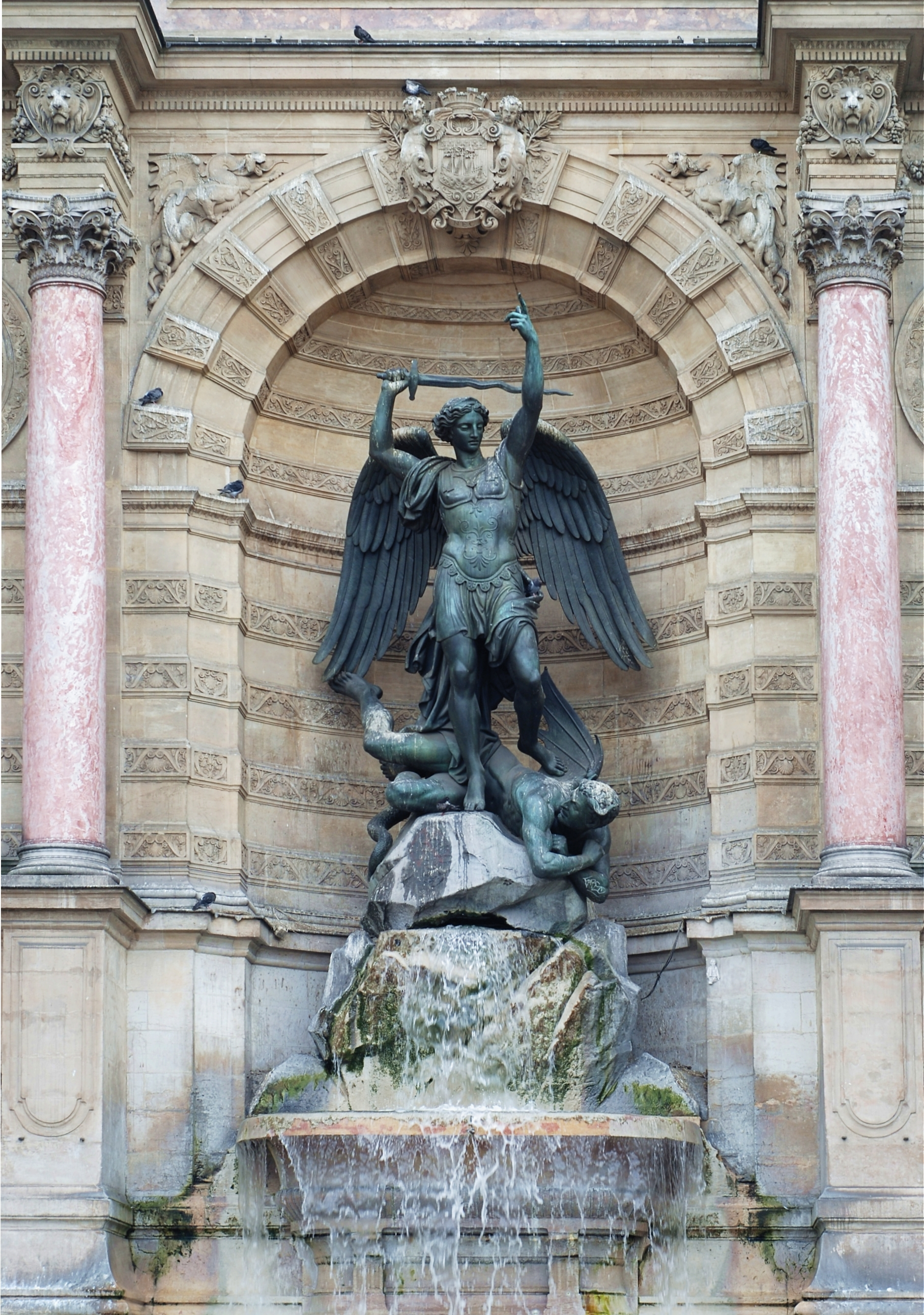
St Michael's Fountain, on Boulevard Saint-Michel, Paris

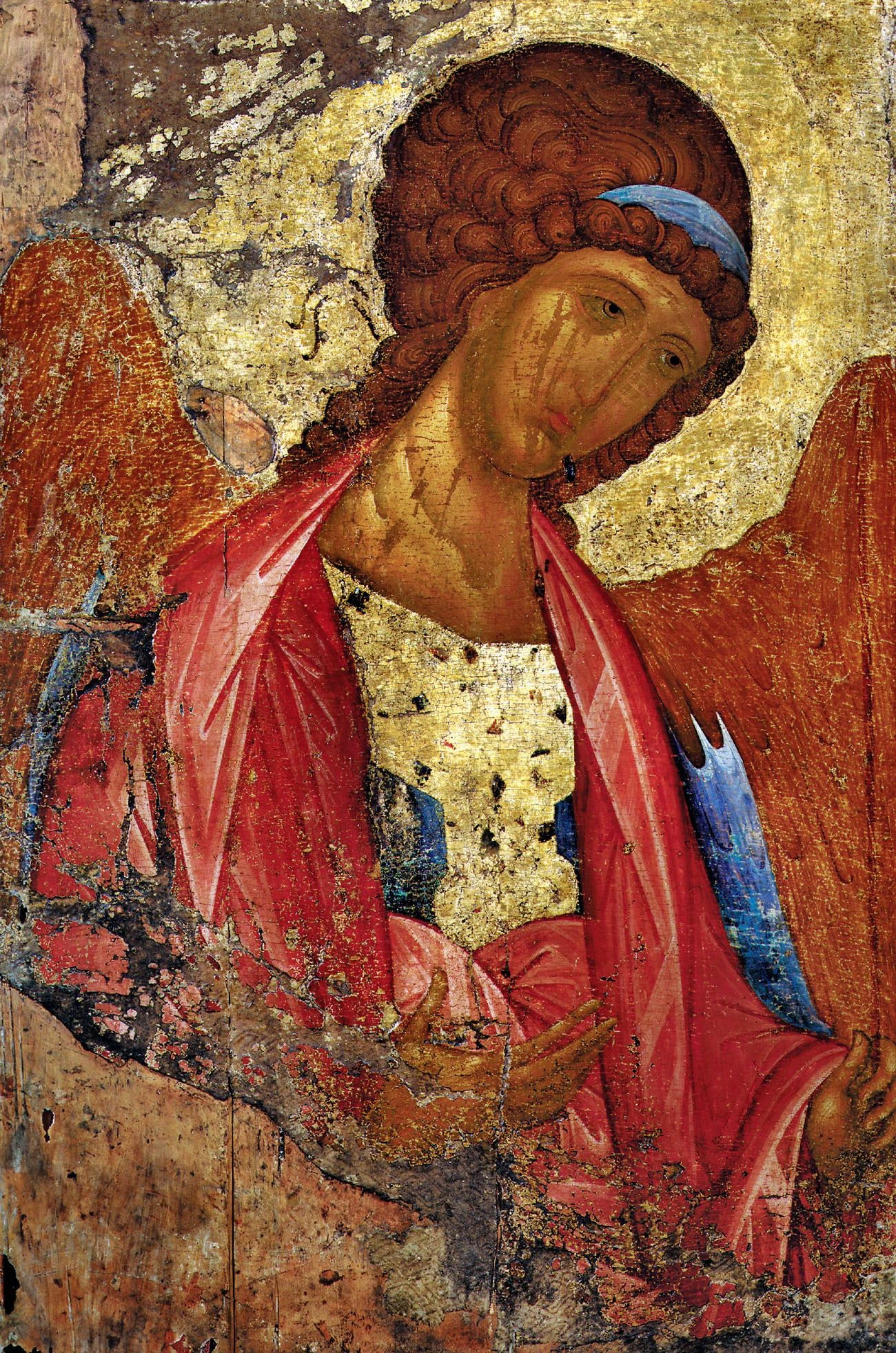
Russian icon by Andrei Rublev, c. 1408

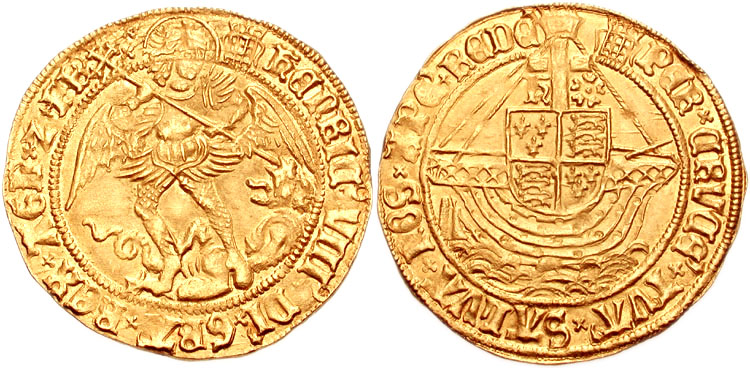
Michael slaying the dragon, as depicted on the obverse of a gold Angel coin, c. 1509-26

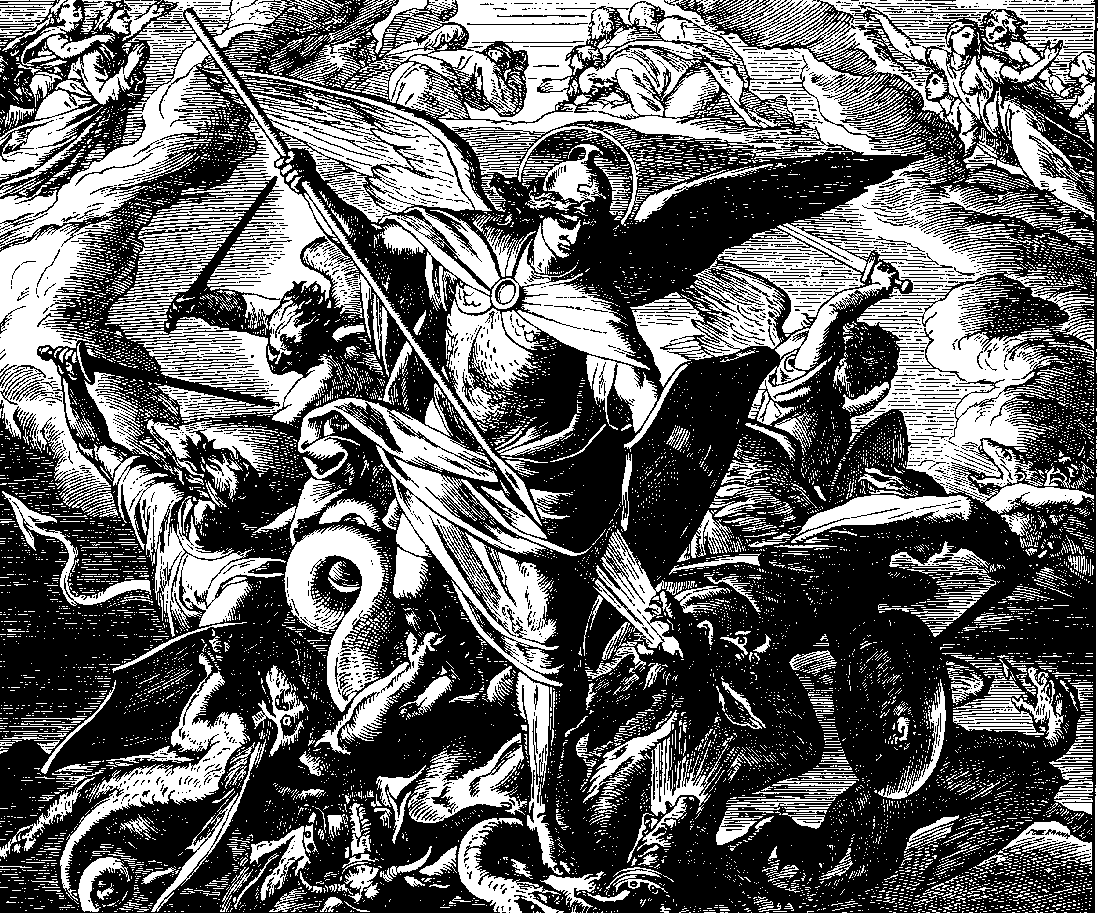
Michael and the Dragon, Julius Schnorr von Carolsfeld, 1860

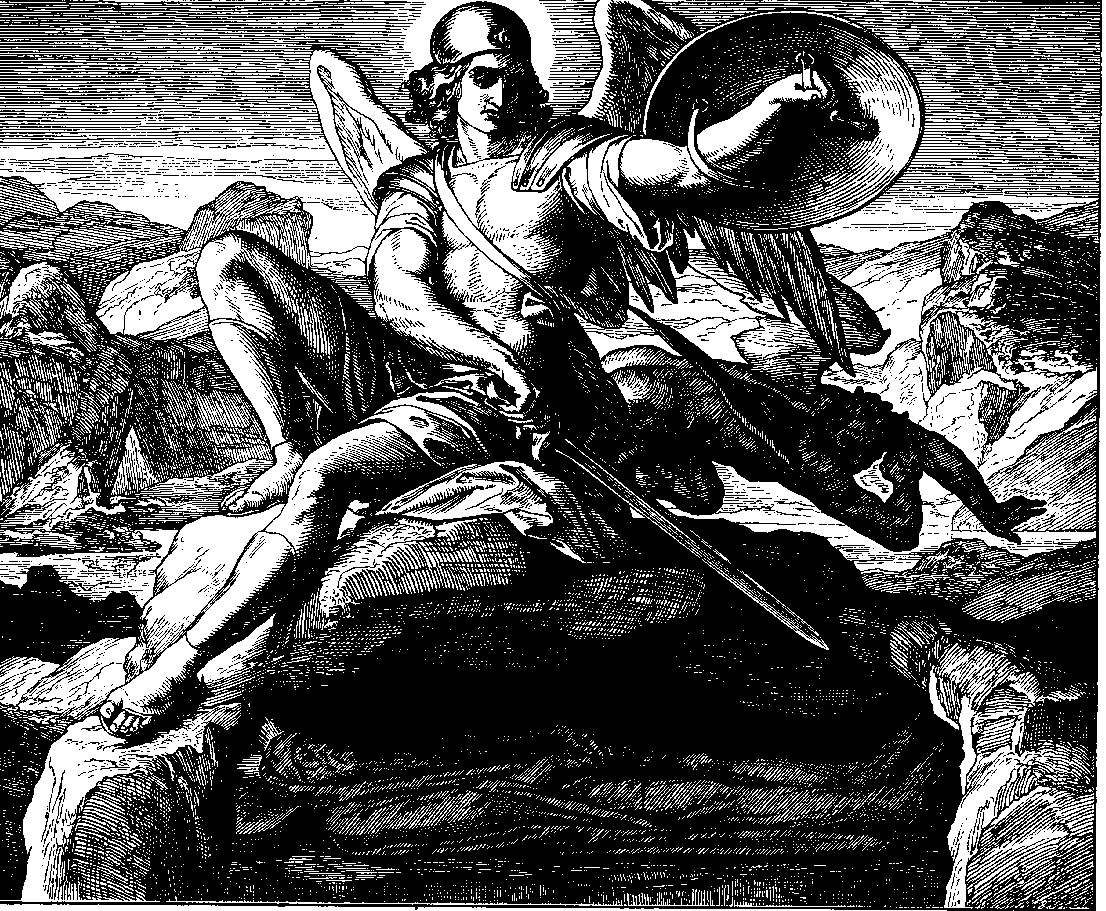
Michael the Archangel protects the body of Moses, Julius Schnorr von Carolsfeld, 1860.

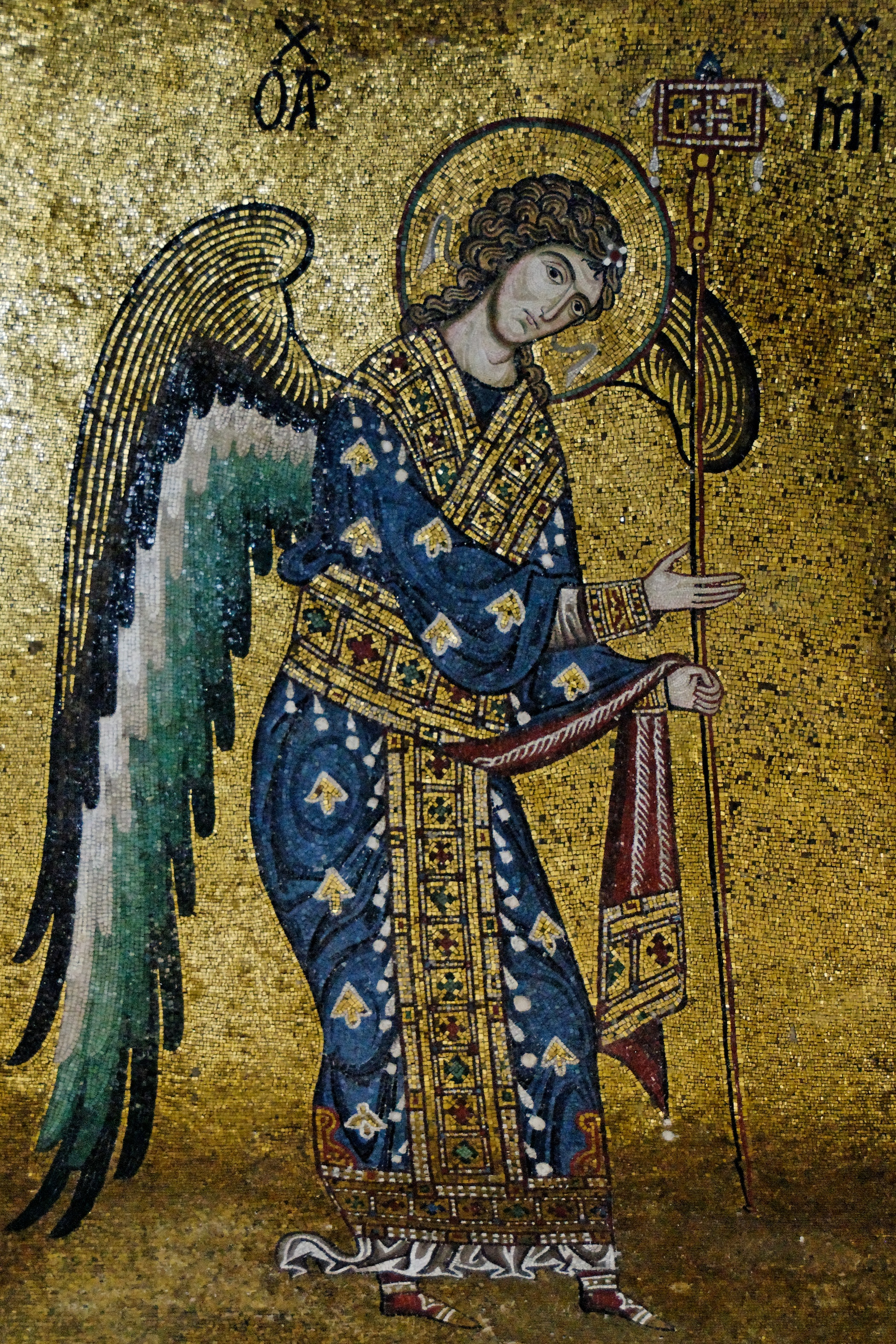
Mosaic in Byzantine court dress, 12th century

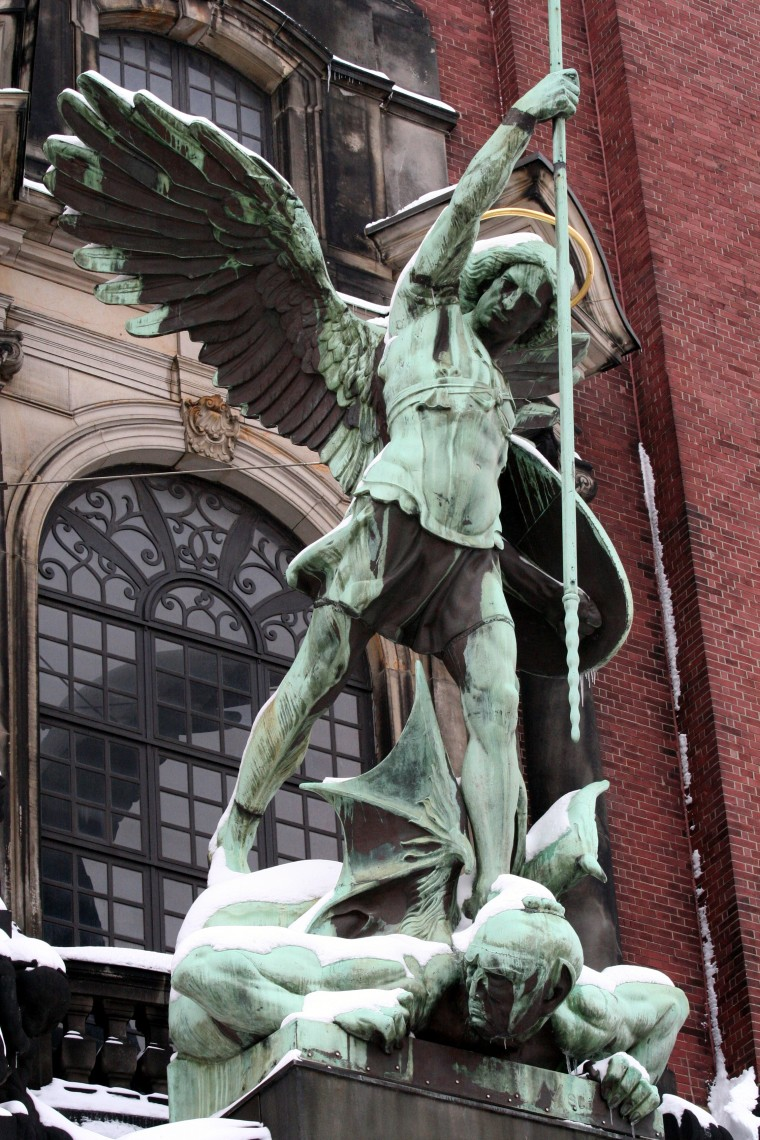
Hamburg, Germany

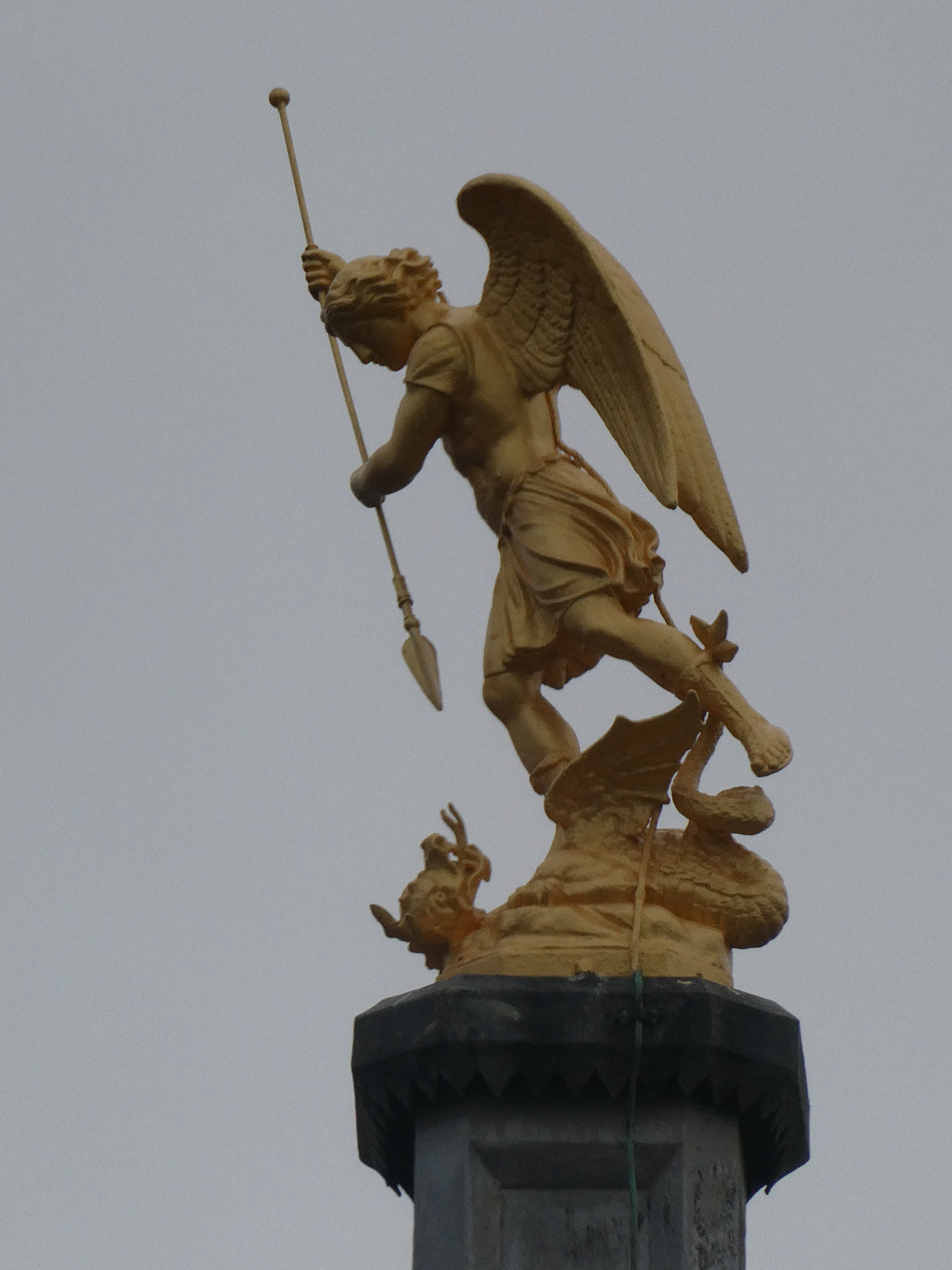
Limerick, Ireland, c. 1780

== See also ==
- Angels in art
- War in Heaven
