= Biccherna =

The Biccherna was the magistrate or chancellery of finance from the 12th century to 1786 for the Republic (later city) of Siena in Tuscany, Italy.

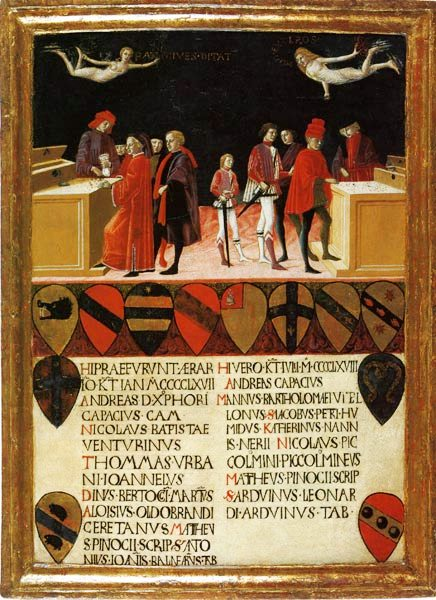
Finances of the City in Time of Peace and War (1468) by Benvenuto di Giovanni,

The records of the office are significant not only because Siena was one of the earliest and most important banking centers of medieval Europe, but also because the books that contain these records were bound with painted leather covers, often made by major artists. These covers tend to display secular subject matter that glorifies the city's government and its citizens.

Many of these covers are displayed in the State Archives of Siena located in the Palazzo Piccolomini located on via Banchi di Sotto corner via Rinaldini.

== Etymology ==
The name was derived from a contraction of the Palace of Blachernae in Constantinople, which contained the imperial treasury.

== History ==
The Biccherna is the oldest and most important financial administration of Siena, which was first established in 1168 when the Scialenghi Counts transferred Asciano to the Senese consuls. With this administrative body, the existing imperial and episcopal tax organizations were reorganised.

The administration of the Biccherna consisted of five members, namely a chamberlain and four provisors, who remained in office for the duration of a term. The chamberlain was the highest person appointed by the Concistoro and was selected from the ranks of members of various monastic orders until 1350. This theoretically guaranteed the independence of the administration from powerful families. The leaders were lay people from the powerful families of the city, who were appointed by and belonged to the Concistoro. The administration of the Biccherna also included notaries, judges, scribe archive administrators, messengers and guards.

Throughout the 13th century and most of the 14th century, the Biccherna were responsible for the entire financial administration of the city. Transactions were recorded in various account books and passed to the Consiglio to be checked at the end of the period. The tasks have changed over time. The Biccherna were also responsible for keeping confiscated weapons, books about detainment and debtors, and lists of notaries, as well as for watching over individuals who could not be elected to public offices. The Biccherna also had to pay alms to churches and monasteries.

Since the first general cadastres of the city were written in 1316, the Biccherna had to regularly update them in books titled Tavola delle possessioni ("Table of possessions").

After 1390, the Biccherna were assigned other tasks, including the management of all outputs. Another innovation was that the chamberlain was selected amongst the laity and remained in office for one year, while the term of office was six months. The Medici reform initially left the area of responsibility of the Biccherna unchanged, but significantly reduced their importance. Under Grand Duke Pietro Leopoldo, the Biccherna was suppressed in the course of a general reform.

== Tables ==
The name of the Senese magistrate was used for painted tables that were bound with the accounting books of the Biccherna and Gabella. Each term was renewed every six months, and at the end of each term, a scene (sometimes with a sacred or symbolic theme or linked to an event of particular importance that occurred during that term) was painted on the wooden cover of the corresponding book. These tables were produced from 1258 to 1682.

The archive of Biccherna was originally located in the rooms next to the church of Saint Pelegrine. When the head office was relocated to Saint Cristopher, all of the documents from other Senese offices were also collected there. At the end of the 13th century, the first attempt was made to establish a public archive in the town hall. The entire camp was in an extremely chaotic state by the beginning of the 15th century. Under Napoleon, the registers were transported to Paris and only partially returned to Siena after it was restored. All of the material that was available in 1858, along with the notarial archive, was transferred to the new state archive.

The first of the 124 tables was painted in around 1258 by Gilio di Pietro. It depicted Ugo, the monk of San Galgano. The oldest paintings represent the only certain documentation for the Sienese painters prior to Duccio, such as Dietisalvi di Speme and Guido di Graziano.

Initial paintings depicted the chamberlain in his activities, often with an arch behind him which represented the meeting room, accompanied by the coats of arms of the Four Provisors and an inscription with their names and terms in office. Paintings in the fourteenth century alternated between religious and civic subjects, and in the fifteenth century, the representation of contemporary events. Later paintings were made for purely decorative purposes rather than for covering the accounting records, and they took on more varied shapes and proportions. The important events of the time, as well as religious scenes, were still frequent subjects of these tables.

Almost the entirety of Biccherna's tables are preserved in the Siena State Archive, but a few dozen, often inherited from the families of those officials who had them painted, ended up in the antiques market and are now scattered in museum collections abroad, especially in London, Berlin, Chatsworth, Budapest, New York, and Boston.

Gallery

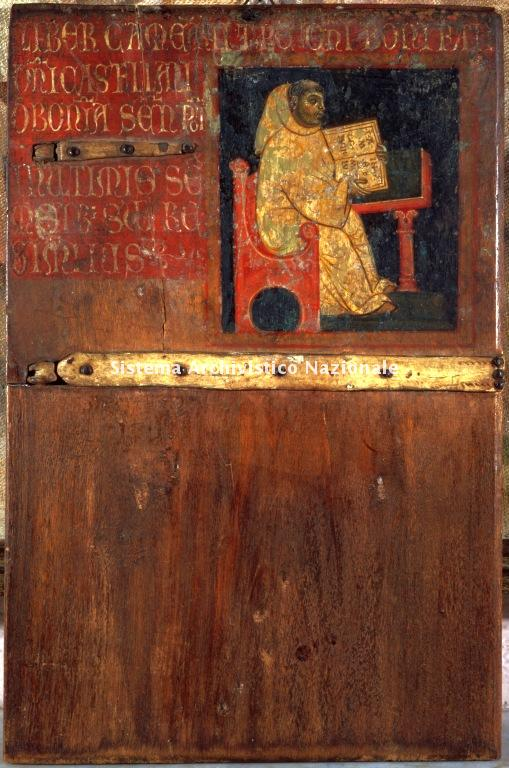
Tablet of Camarlingo Don Ugo, Monk of San Galgano (1258) by Gilio di Pietro

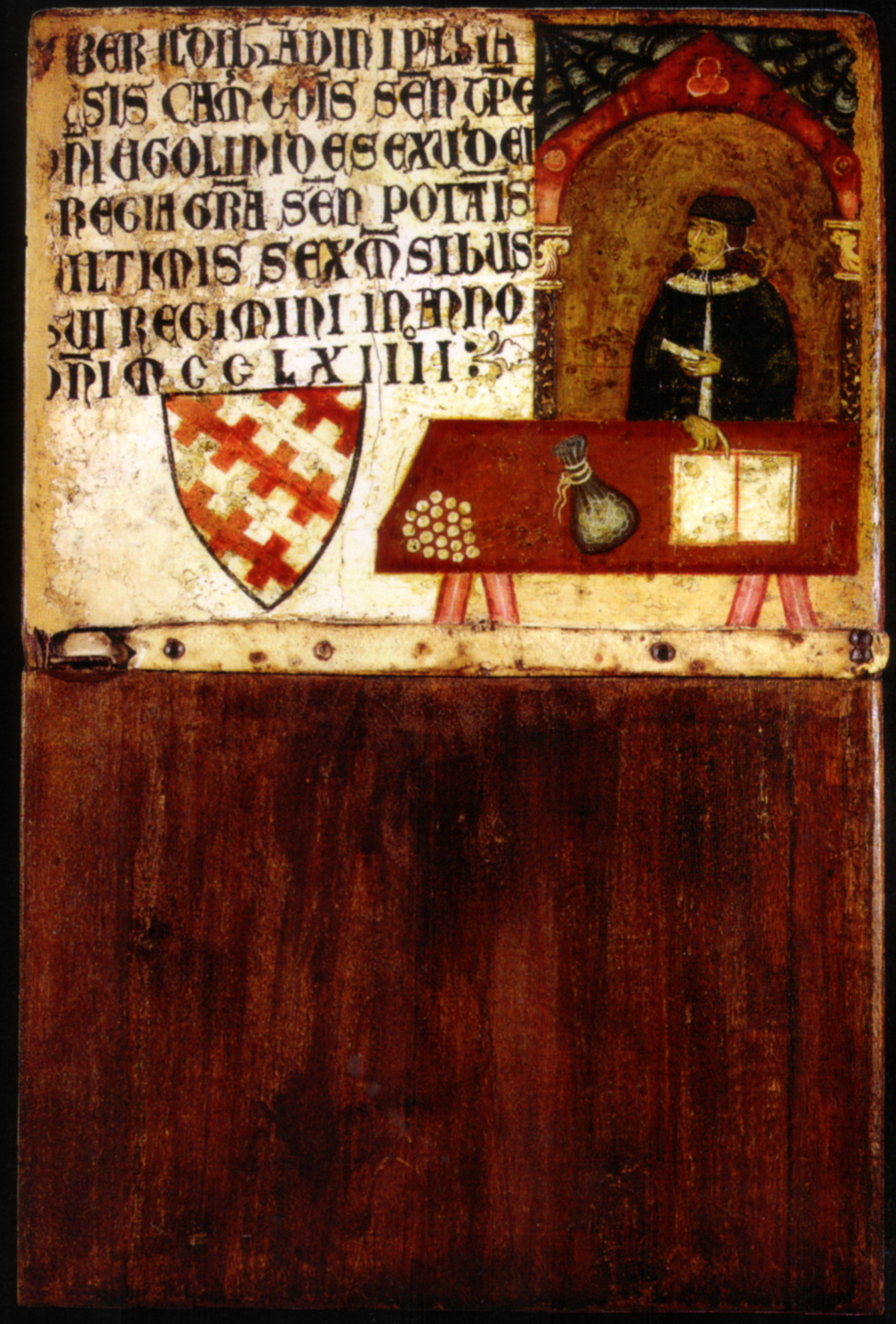
Table of the camarlengo Ildebrandino Pagliaresi (1264), by Dietisalvi di speme

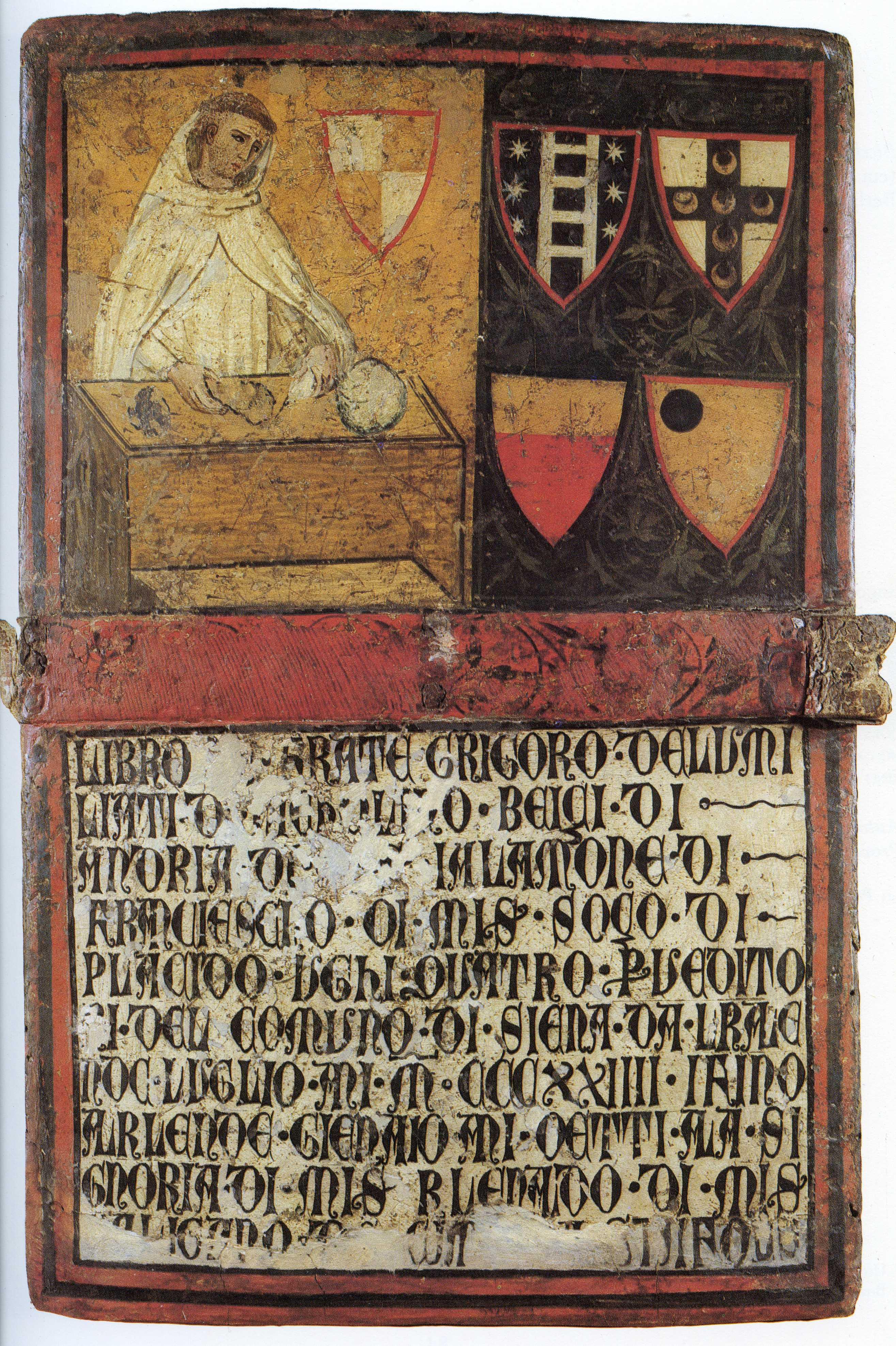
Table of Camerlengo Don Gregorio, Umiliati Monk (1324)

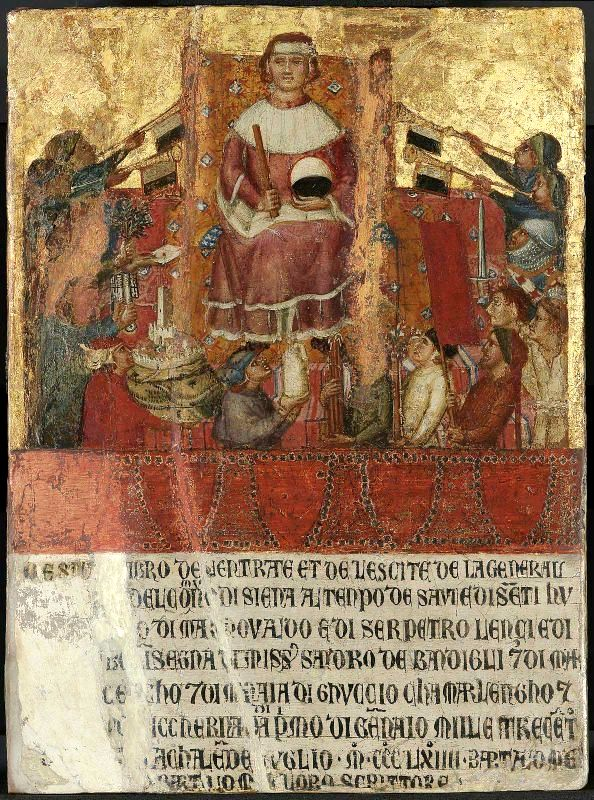
Biccherna Cover: The Tribute Offering (c.1364) by Lippo Vanni

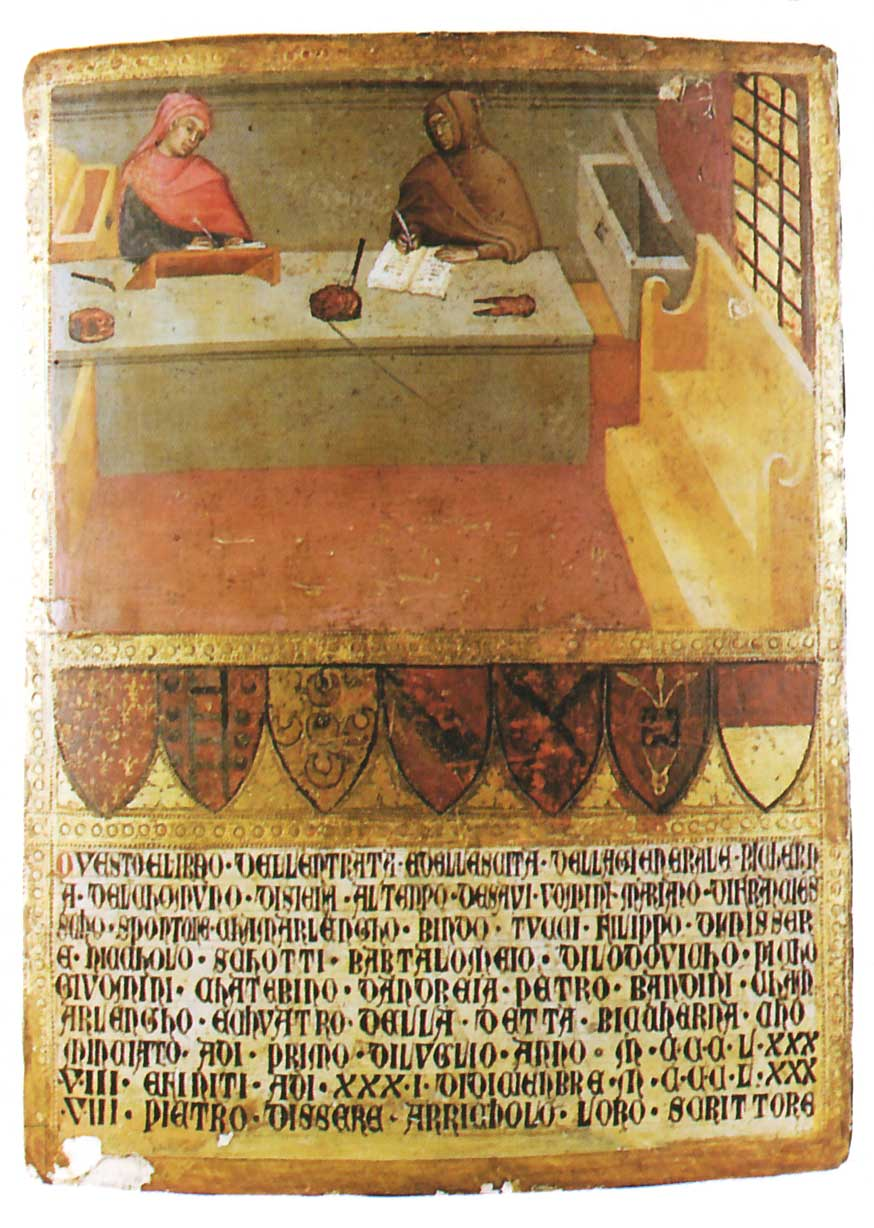
Table with the Office of the Camerlengo

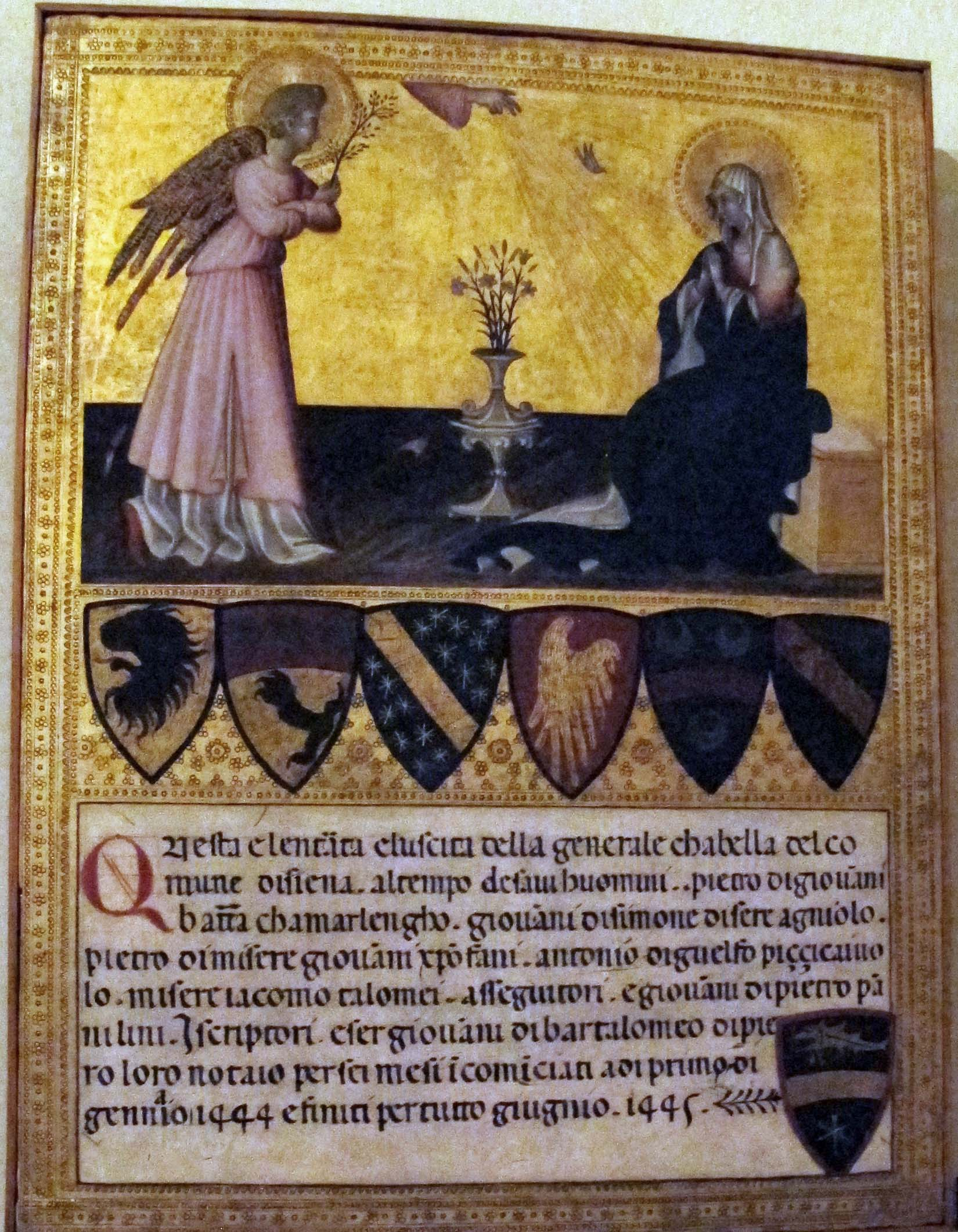
Table with Annuciation (1445) by Giovanni di Paolo

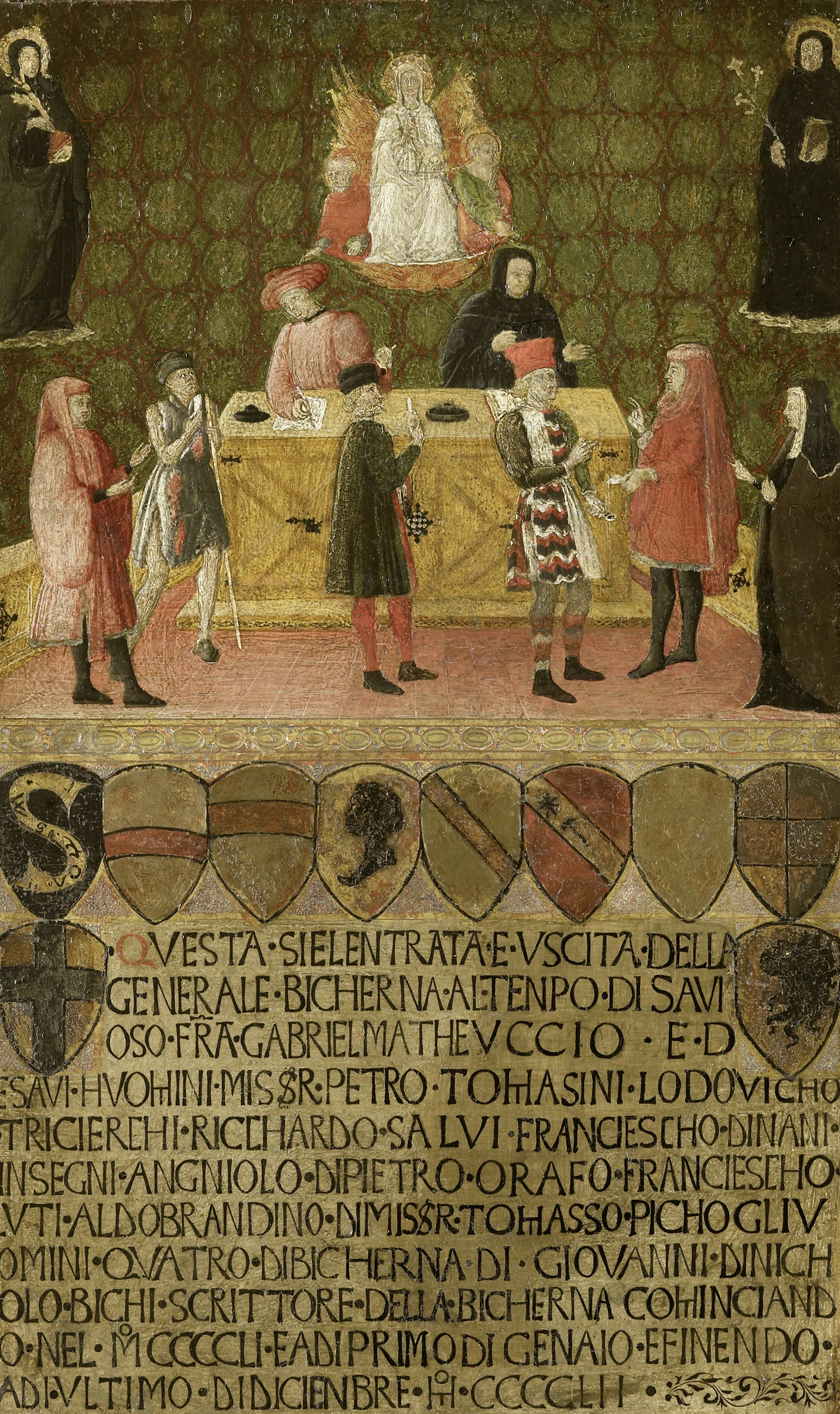
Table with office of the tax-collector

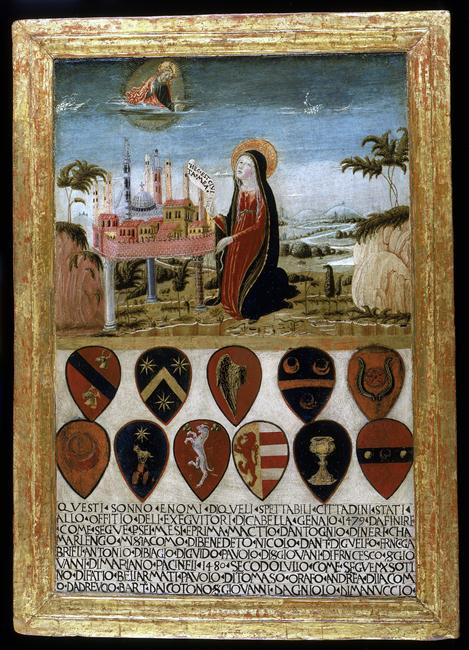
The Virgin Recommends the City of Siena to Jesus by Neroccio di Bartolomeo de' Landi

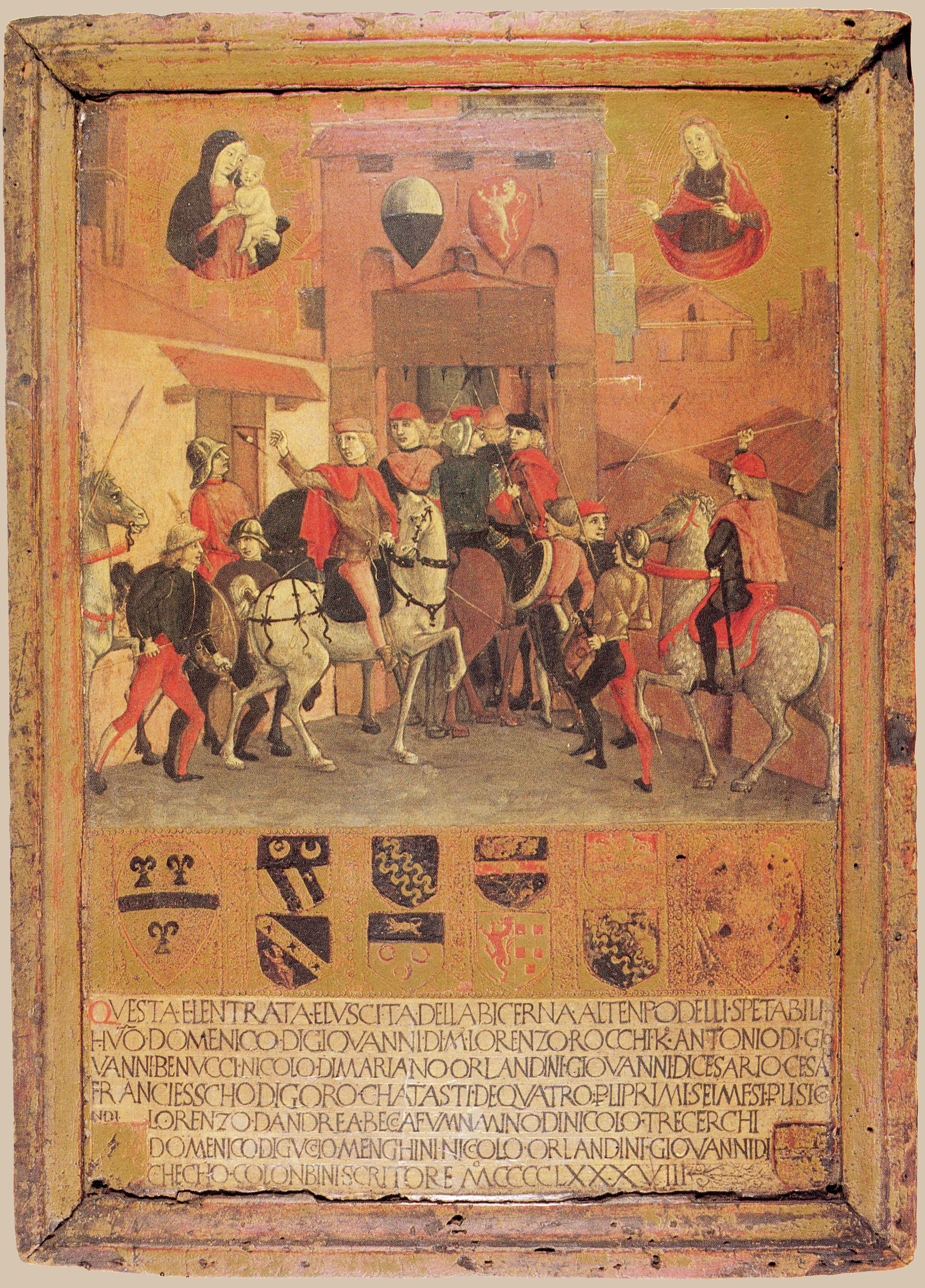
Pandolfo Petrucci enters through Porta Fontebranda

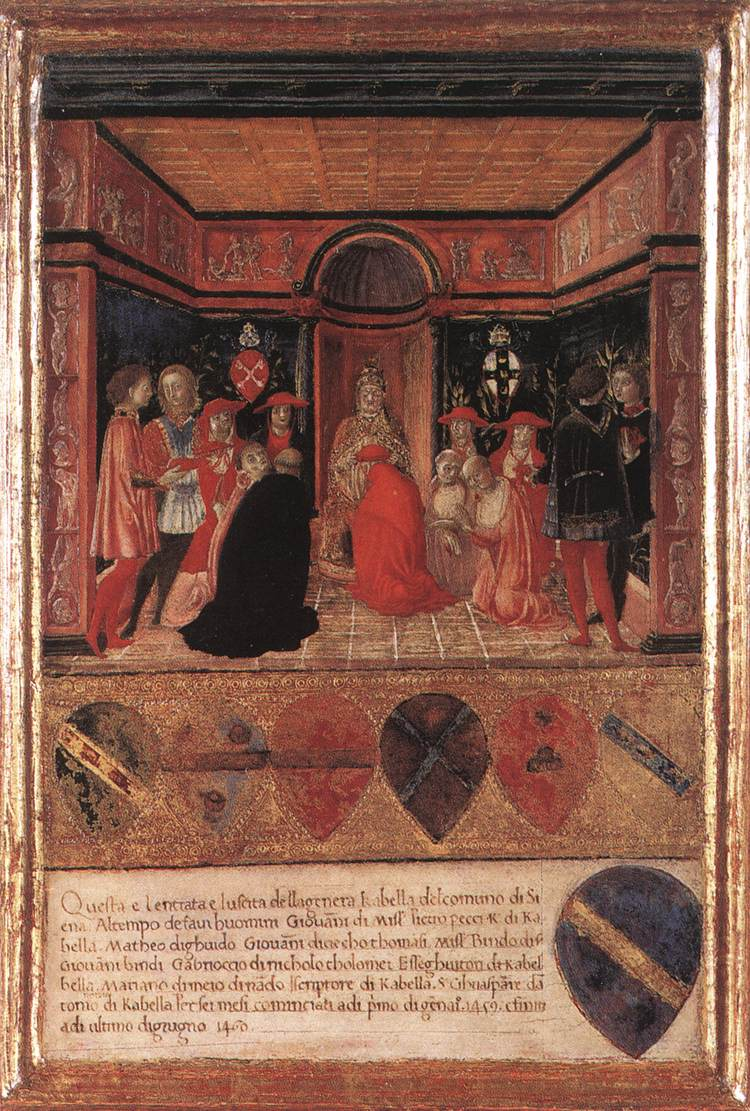
Pope Pius II Names his Nephew Cardinal by Francesco di Giorgio

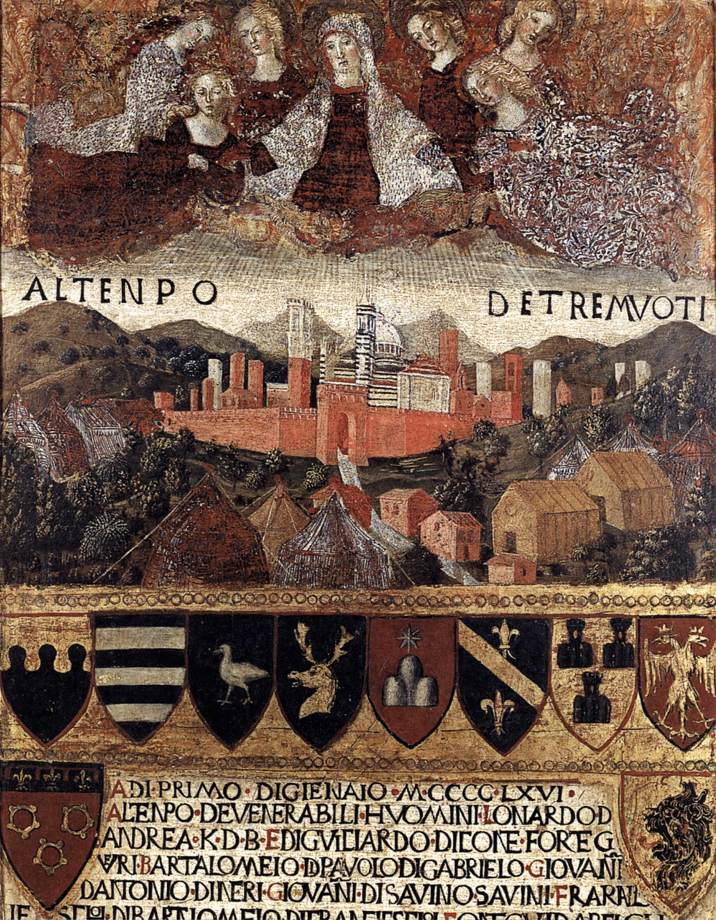
Madonna of the Earthquake by Francesco di Giorgio

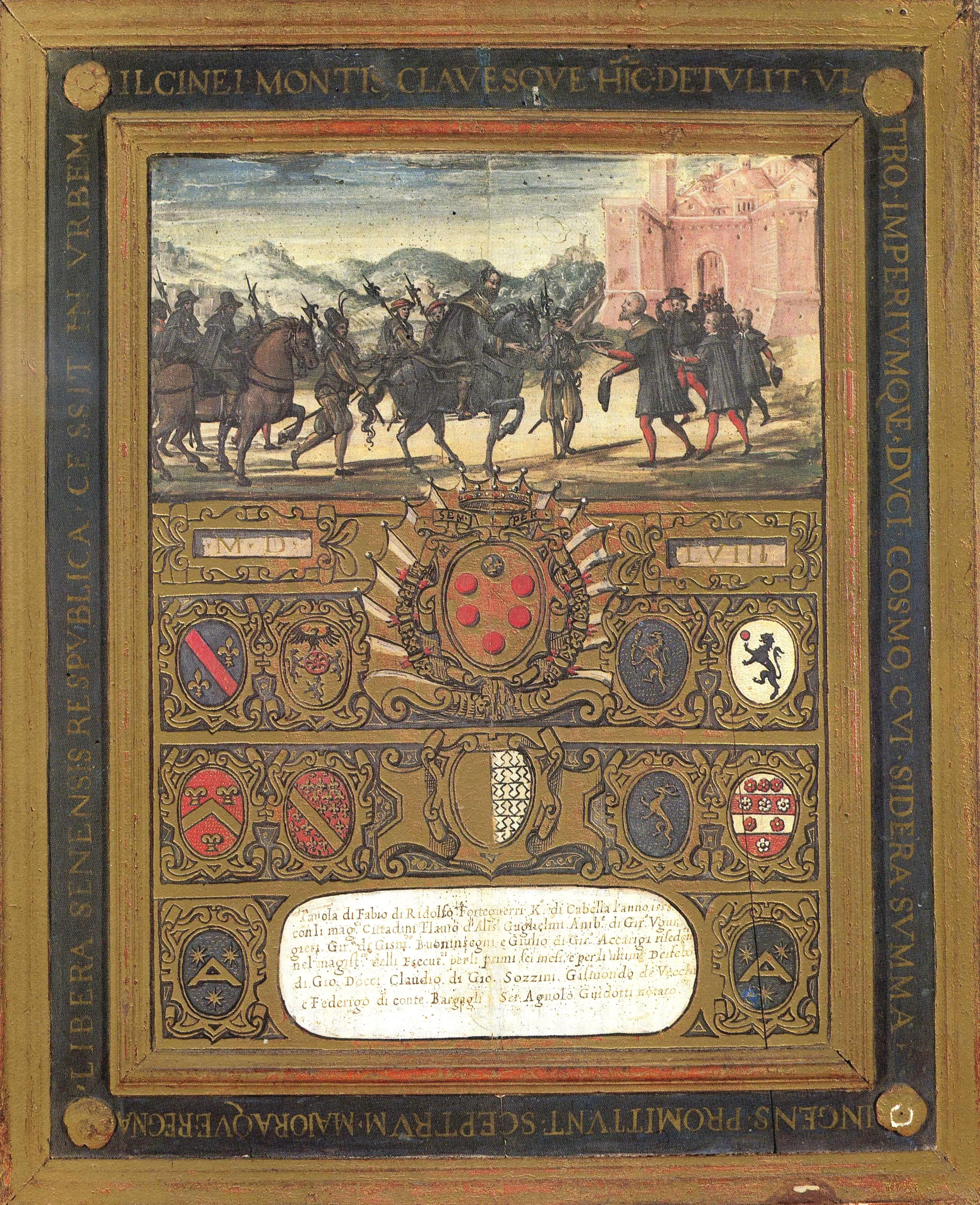
Siege of Sienese families in Montalcino in 1559

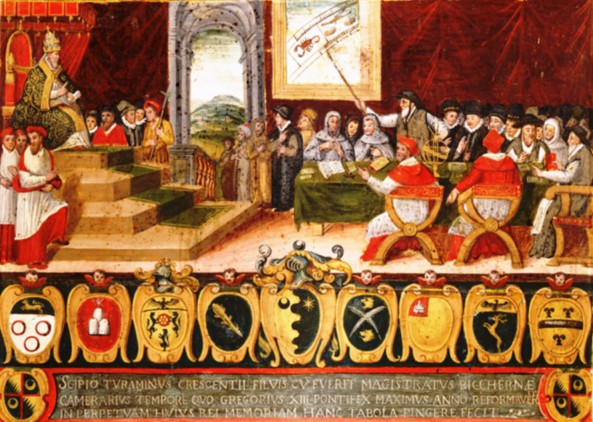
Table # 72
