= The Virgin Recommends the City of Siena to Jesus =

Painted table by Neroccio de' Landi

- La Vergine raccomanda la cittá di Siena a Gesú (Italian)
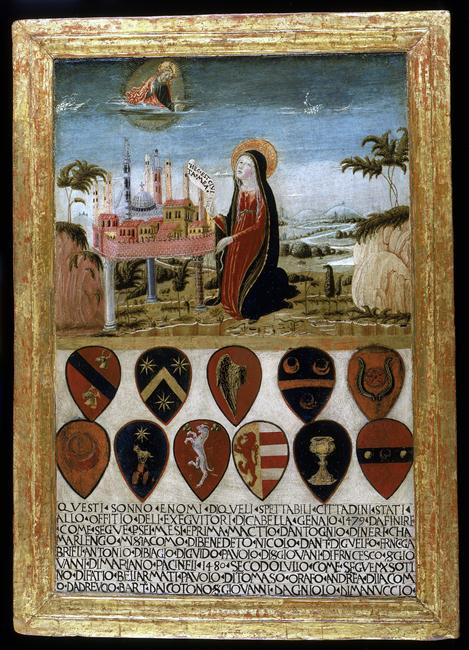
- Reproduction of the State Archives of Siena
- Artist: Neroccio di Bartolomeo de' Landi
- Year: 1480
- Dimensions: 54 cm × 38 cm (21 in × 15 in)

The Virgin Recommends the City of Siena to Jesus (Italian: La Vergine raccomanda la cittá di Siena a Gesú) is the subject of a table of Biccherna painted by Neroccio di Bartolomeo de' Landi in 1480.

== History ==
In Siena, it was customary for painters to illustrate wooden tablets that were used to bind books in which notaries registered the accounts of the Biccherna (managed by the chamberlain, himself designated by the authorities of the Commune for six months) before storing them in the State Archives of Siena. The Commune occasionally delegated the decoration of its binding plates to influential painters. In particular, the cover of the 1344 Gabella was painted by Ambrogio Lorenzetti. Bernard Berenson, Emil Jacobsen, Lucy Olcott and Allan Stuart Weller, among others, attributed the registry of the 1480 Gabella to Neroccio di Bartolomeo de' Landi. (Note: Other art historians such as Selwyn Brinton and William Heywood at Francesco di Giorgio Martini and Guidoccio Cozzarelli (Arthur McComb).) Michele Maccherini suggested a probable command from Neroccio's uncle, Iacomo di Benedetto di Neroccio (then a functioning magistrate), whose blazon and name appear on the table.

Since the beginning of the 13th century, the Gabella had been a subordinate body to the Biccherna, which was gradually becoming an autonomous service. Its role was to maintain the numerous gabelles, or direct and indirect taxes of Siena and its county, such as the tolls at the gates of the city.

At the beginning of each month, judges took into account the income and expenditure of the previous month before the General Council. They were assisted by a few officers and by a notary, who had been responsible for the sale of the annual revenues of the gabelles regularly leased by auction since 1290.

== Iconography ==
The main subject of this table of Biccherna shows the deep devotion of the city of Siena to the Marian cult, established in the 12th century. A seal from this period shows the city accompanied by the Virgin and Child with the following sentence: Salvet Virgo Senam veterem quam signat amenam ("May the Virgin preserve Old Siena, which she makes beautiful"). Starting at the Battle of Montaperti, Siena is permanently under the protection of the Virgin of Assumption; the phrase Sena vetus civitas Virginis ("Old Siena, city of the Virgin") had been engraved on coins as far back as 1279. Devotion to Mary thus became a sign of cultural identity.

The intervention of Mary as patroness saint of the city is then systematically invoked when disasters such as epidemics, earthquakes and wars, or to protect themselves from them (which seems to be the case here) with the apotropaic use of its image. Siena had been struck by a series of earthquakes throughout the 15th century, including between 1466 and 1467. On the other hand, the Ottoman conquest of Otranto in August 1480 was a source of fears shared by Siena and by all the states of the Italian peninsula. The Virgin is thus regarded as the protector of the city and (by entrusting Siena to Jesus) a privileged mediator both for the city and for its inhabitants, which are brought together behind its walls.

Details

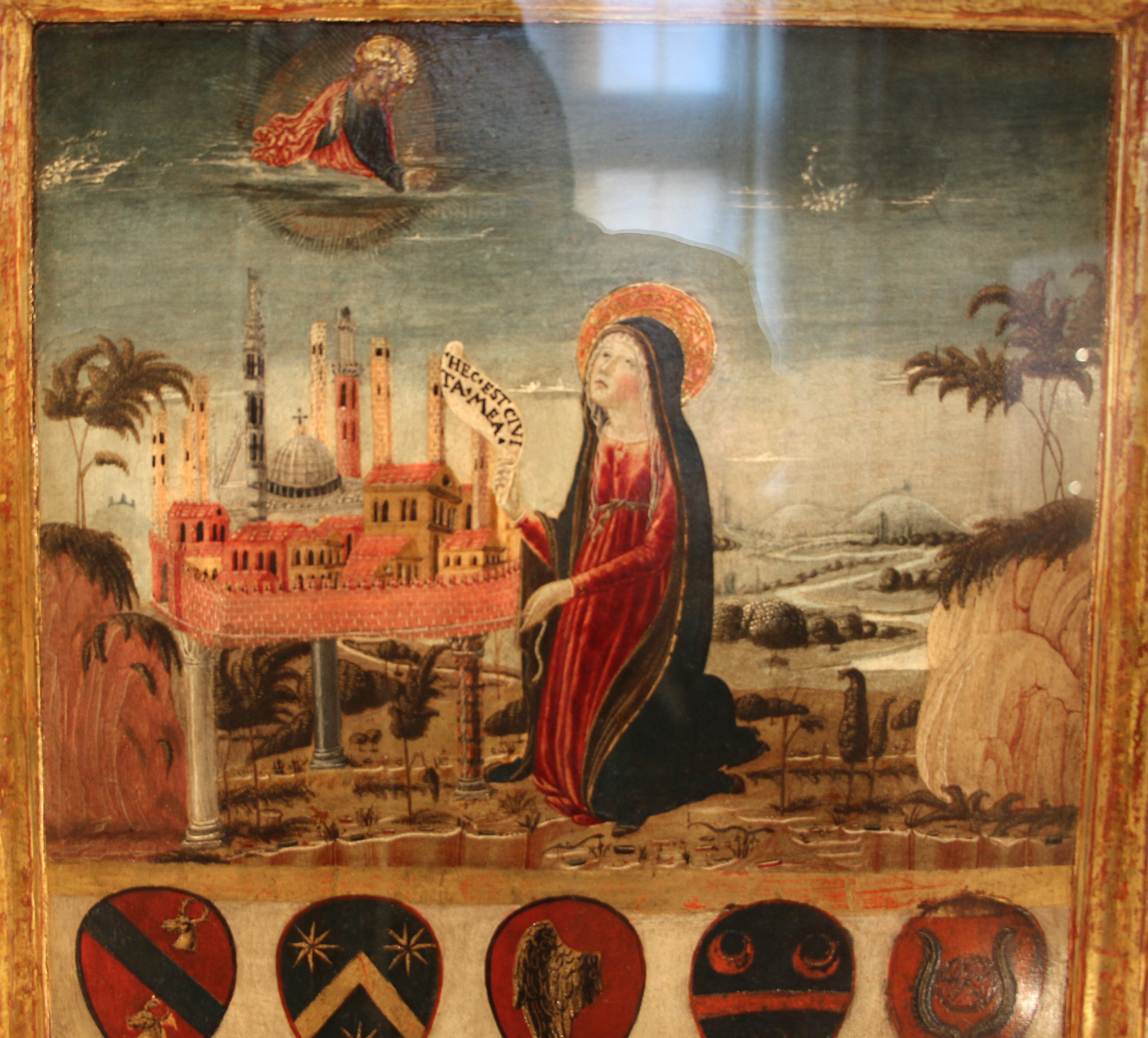

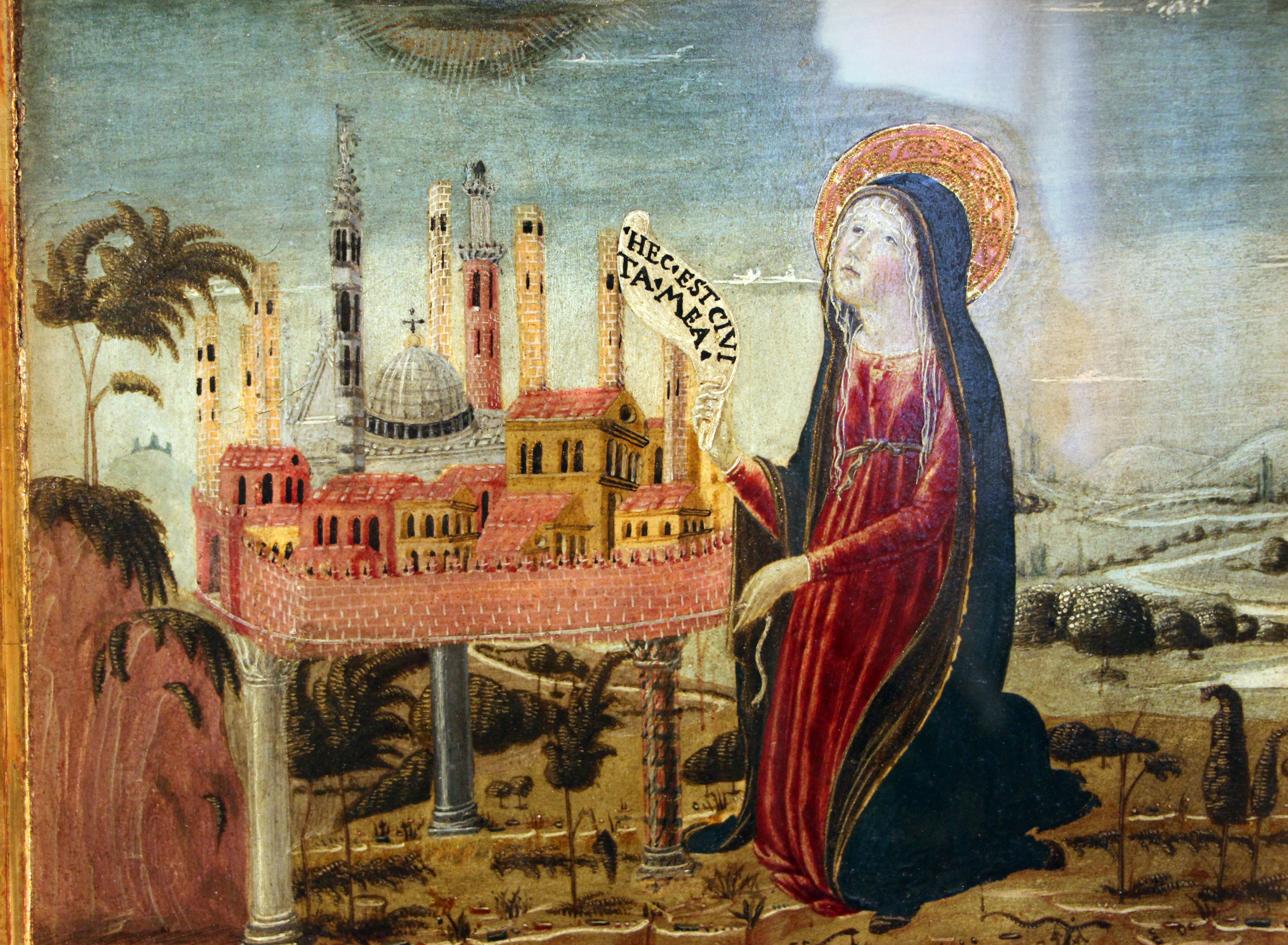

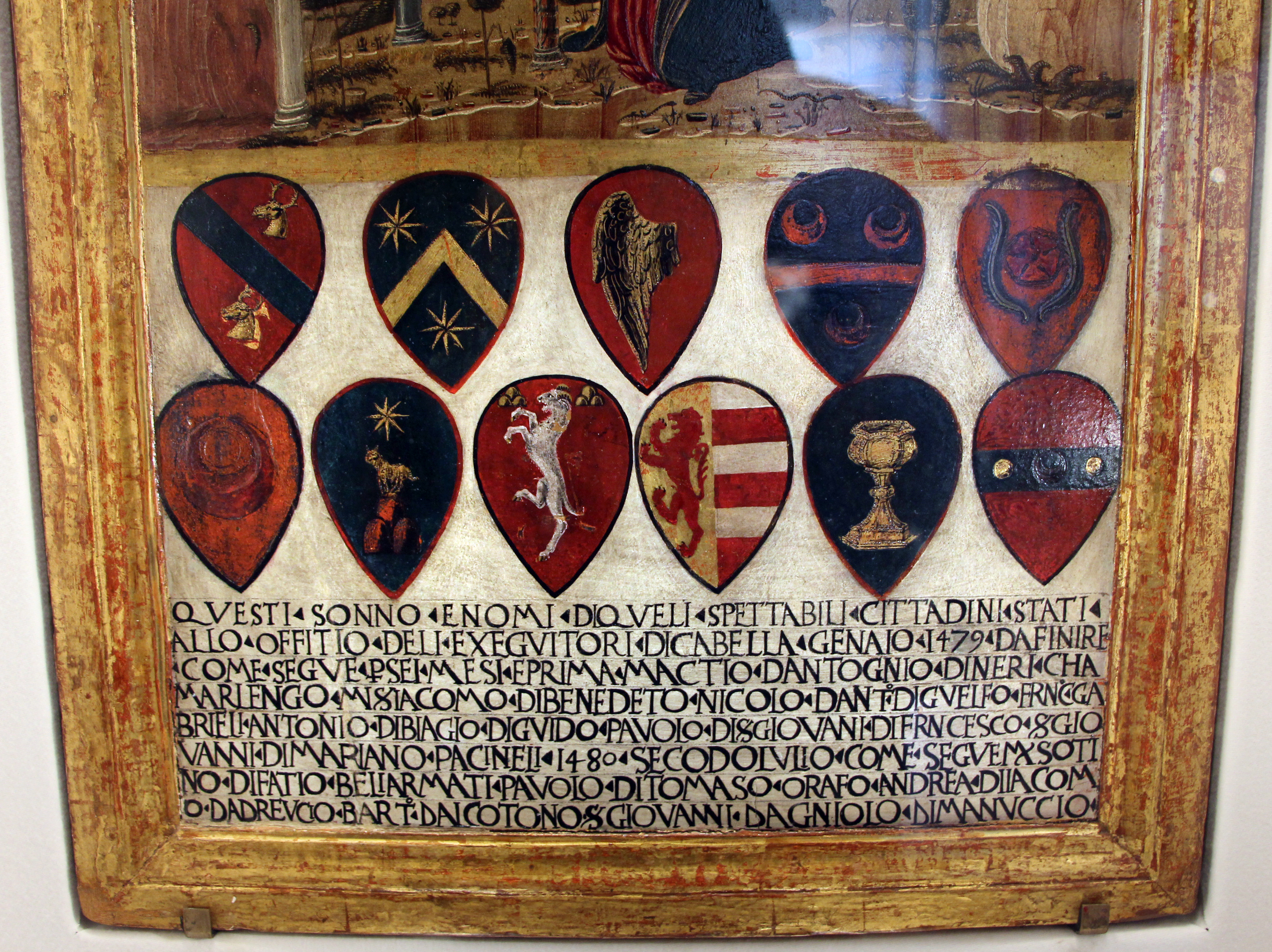

== Description ==
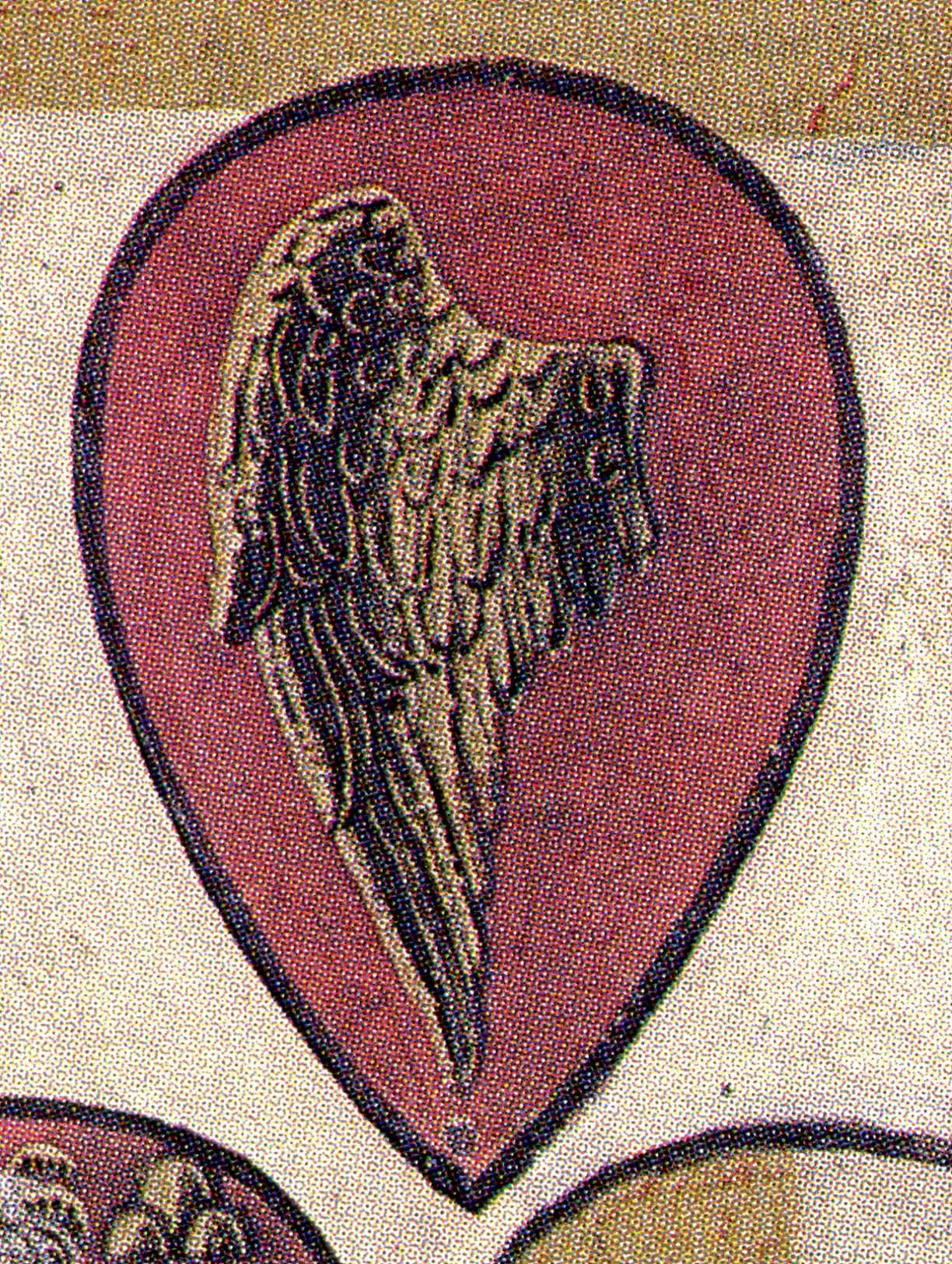
Detail of one of the eleven arms of the Gules.

The upper part of the table depicts Mary in a movement of prayer, kneeling and raising the eyes towards a serene sky in which Jesus appears circumscribed by golden rays. In front of it stands the city of Siena, which is summed up in its most representative civil and religious monuments; its walls, the Siena Cathedral, its towers including the Torre del Mangia, and some houses of noble families. Mary holds a scroll bearing the Latin inscription HEC EST CIVITAS MEA ("this is my city") on her right hand while enclosing a golden rope around the walls of the city, symbolizing peace and protection. Intact, Siena is raised by three columns; one white, one black and one golden; these are probably a reference to the colors of the Commune. The surface of the ground is deeply cracked. On the right is a brief overview of the county with fragmentary vegetation, a road (Via Francigena), and the Crete Senesi at the horizon.

Below the scene, a horizontal space includes on two lines the eleven arms of the magistrates in office in 1480: Martini, Landi, Guelfi, Tolomei, Paccinelli, Bellarmati, di Paolo di Tommaso, Monaturi, Cottoni, Azzurri and di Giovanni d’Agnolo di Mannuccio. Also mentioned in the lower inscription:

Questi sonno e nomi di queli spettabili cittadini stati allo offitio deli exeguitori di Cabella Genaio 1479 da finire come segue per sei mesi. E prima Mactio D'Antognio di Neri Chamarlengo, misser Iacomo di Benedeto, Nicolo D'Antonio di Guelfo, Francesco Gabrieli, Antonio di Baigio di Guido, Pavolo di ser Giovani di Francesco, ser Giovanni di Mariano Pacinelli. 1480 secodo Lulio come segue: missere Sotino di Fatio Bellarmati, Pavolo di Tommaso Orafo, Andrea di Iacomo D'Adreucio, Bartolomeo dal Cotono, ser Giovanni D'Agniolo di Manuccio. (Note: Italian: Questi sono i nomi di quegli rispettabili cittadini stati all'ufficio degli esecutori di Cabella nel Gennaio 1479 da finire come segue per sei mesi. E prima Macio D'Antognio di Neri Chamarlengo, signore Iacomo di Benedeto, Nicolò D'Antonio di Guelfo, Francesco Gabrieli, Antonio di Baigio di Guido, Pavolo di signore Giovani di Francesco, signore di Giovanni di Mariano Pacinelli. 1480 secondo Luglio come segue: signore Sotino di Fatio Bellarmati, Pavolo di Tommaso Orafo, Andrea di Iacomo D'Adreucio, Bartolomeo dal Cotono, signore Giovanni D'Agniolo di Manuccio. English: These are the names of those respectable citizens who were at the executive office of the Cabella in January 1479 to end as follows for six months. And first, Macio D'Antognio of the Black Chamberlain, Mister Iacomo di Benedeto, Nicolò D'Antonio di Guelfo, Francesco Gabrieli, Antonio di Baigio di Guido, Pavolo di Giovani di Francesco, Sir Giovanni di Mariano Pacinelli. [Those in office on] 2 July 1480 [are] as follows: Mister Sotino di Fatio Bellarmati, Pavolo di Tommaso Orafo, Andrea di Iacomo D'Adreucio, Bartolomeo dal Cotono, [and] Sir Giovanni D'Agniolo di Manuccio.)
