= Dietisalvi di Speme =

Italian painter

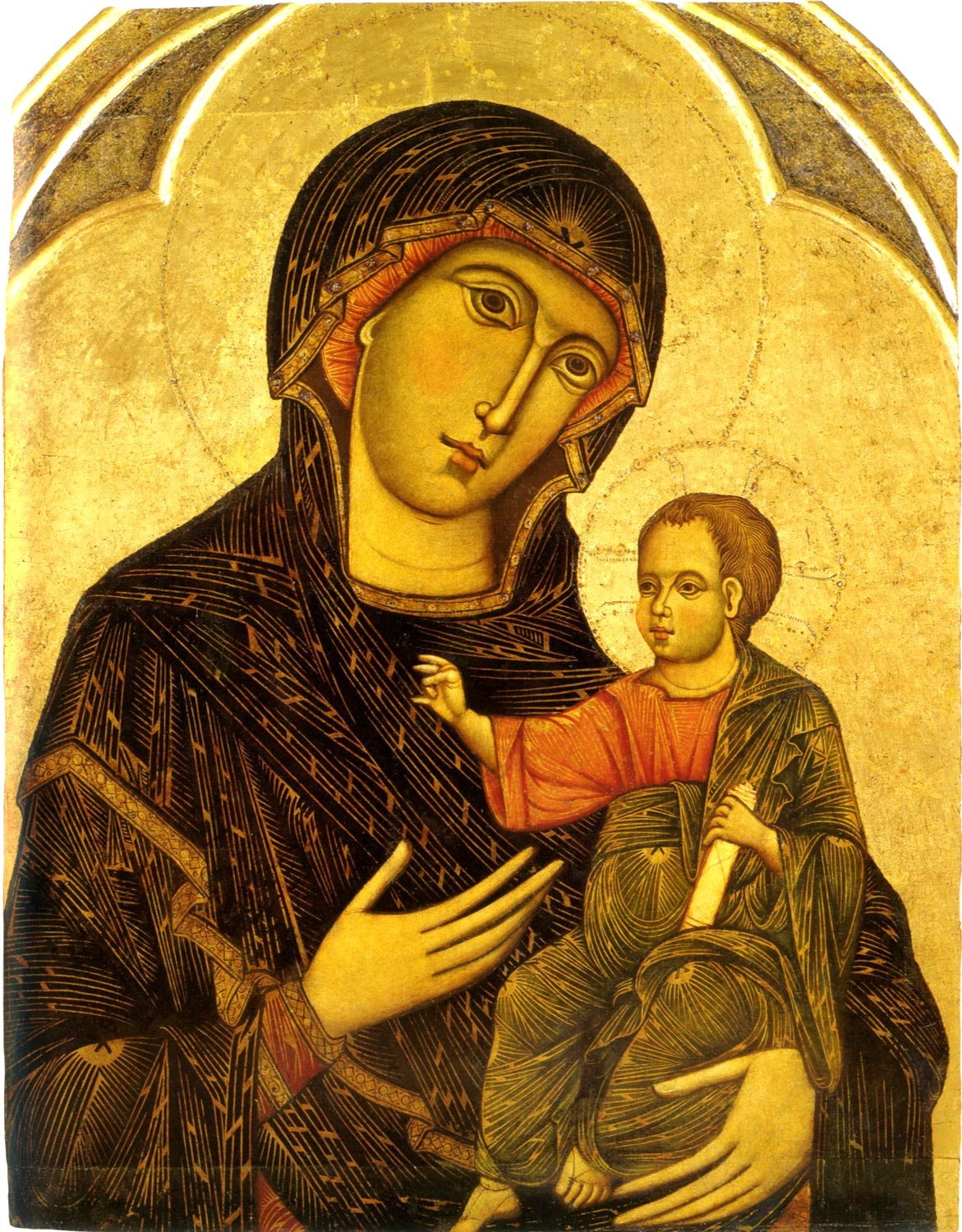
Madonna and Child, 1260-67, Siena

Dietisalvi di Speme was an Italian painter, who worked in Siena between 1250 and 1291. In his work he influenced and was influenced by Cimabue.

== Life ==
His name, meaning May-God-Save-You (son) of Hope seems likely to be of the kind often given to a child abandoned by its mother and raised as an orphan.

The first mention of him is dated 1250 and was found in the records of the Biccherna or financial administration of Siena, a mention now lost but transcribed in the eighteenth century by Giovan Girolamo Carli. This administration had the custom of having the covers of its accounting books decorated. In this contest there are mentions of Dietisalvi di Speme in 1261, 1262, 1276, 1278, 1282-1283 and 1284. Overall he seems to have painted some 56 such covers between 1259 and 1288. Of all these, only four have survived, and these are in fact his only documented works. The authorities seem to have employed only Dietisalvi in the years 1259-1272 and after this they instituted a system of calling also upon other painters (including Duccio), though Dietisalvi seems to have received the lion's share of the commissions.

In 1262 he painted a now lost gonfalon, a civic processional heraldic flag or banner, for the Terzo di San Martino, one of the three main territorial divisions of the city of Siena in the Middle Ages. In 1281 (or, according to another document, in 1291), he executed an inscription for Palazzo Pubblico, the civic headquarters, and in 1285 and in August 1291 he decorated two chests or trunks, also now lost.

In 1285 and in 1291 it is recorded that he was resident first in the contrada of Sant'Egidio de' Malavolti, in the Terzo di Camollia area of the city and then in the contrada of San Donato. These various documents consistently give only his first name, Dietisalvi, and the quasi-surname di Speme appears only on a single occasion, in a record of 18 January 1290 (which according to Sienese usage was styled 1289).

== Works ==
The four items of the financial administration whose decoration is attributed to Dietisalvi, that of 1267 shows only the heraldic devices of the Quattro Provveditori, that is the four chief civic finance officers ( Archivio di Stato di Siena (Siena State Archives), inv. 3; that of July–December 1264 is concerned with Ildebrandino Pagliaresi (Archivio di Stato di Siena, inv. 2); that of January–June 1270 with Ranieri Pagliaresi (Archivio di Stato di Siena, inv. 4); and finally that of July–December 1282 is concerned with Don Griffolino (Budapest’s Museum of Fine Arts, inv. 2-36). These four works show a development of style over the two decades, in the direction of a greater similarity with the work of Giunta Pisano and Cimabue, and with the freer strokes and paler effects of his more diligent contemporary Guido da Siena, with whom he in fact had sometimes worked.

In 1991 Luciano Bellosi claimed considerable importance for Dietisalvi, as an artist, attributing to him a number of important works painted on wood, that had at different times been assigned variously either to him or to Guido of Siena. Such works included the Madonna di San Bernardino, dated 1262, the Madonna col Bambino of the Museo statale d’arte medievale e moderna (State Museum of Medieval and Modern Art) of Arezzo, the Galli-Dunn Madonna and the Madonna del Voto, executed for an altar in Siena Cathedral. These works display a gradual distancing from the influence of Coppo di Marcovaldo, and a movement towards more substantial depiction of bodies and a greater attention to colour.

In addition, Dietisalvi is credited with the outer doors on the reliquary of Blessed Andrea Gallerani (in the Pinacoteca Nazionale (National Gallery) of Siena, inv. 5). The interior doors of the reliquary are attributed to Guido da Siena. Likewise attributed to Dietisalvi are some of the panels of the Dossale di Badia Ardenga (Reredos of Badia Ardenga) (in the Pinacoteca Nazionale of Siena) and the Reliquary of Saints Francis, Catherine, Bartholomew and Clare (also in the Pinacoteca Nazionale of Siena).

The final part of Dietisalvi's career is associated with the cross preserved in Siena’s Museo delle pie disposizioni (Museum of Pious Bequests), which seems to be influenced by the Maestà, then a recent work of Cimabue.

Finally, some frescoes in the crypt of Siena Cathedral are taken to be his, in particular the depiction of the Kiss of Judas, and some other discovered in recent times.

== Gallery ==
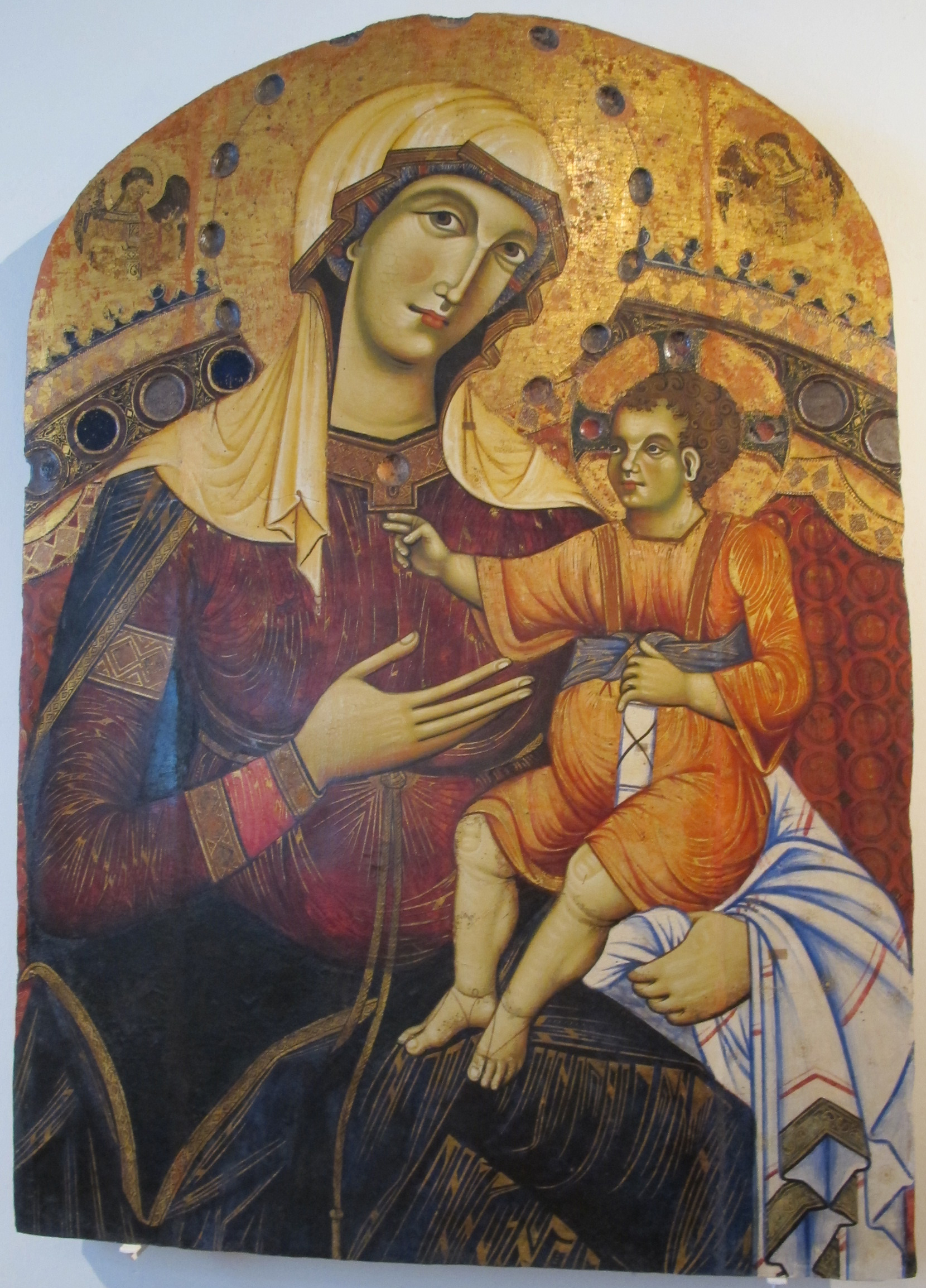
Madonna of San Bernardino, 1261
(142 x 100 cm) Pinacoteca nazionale, Siena

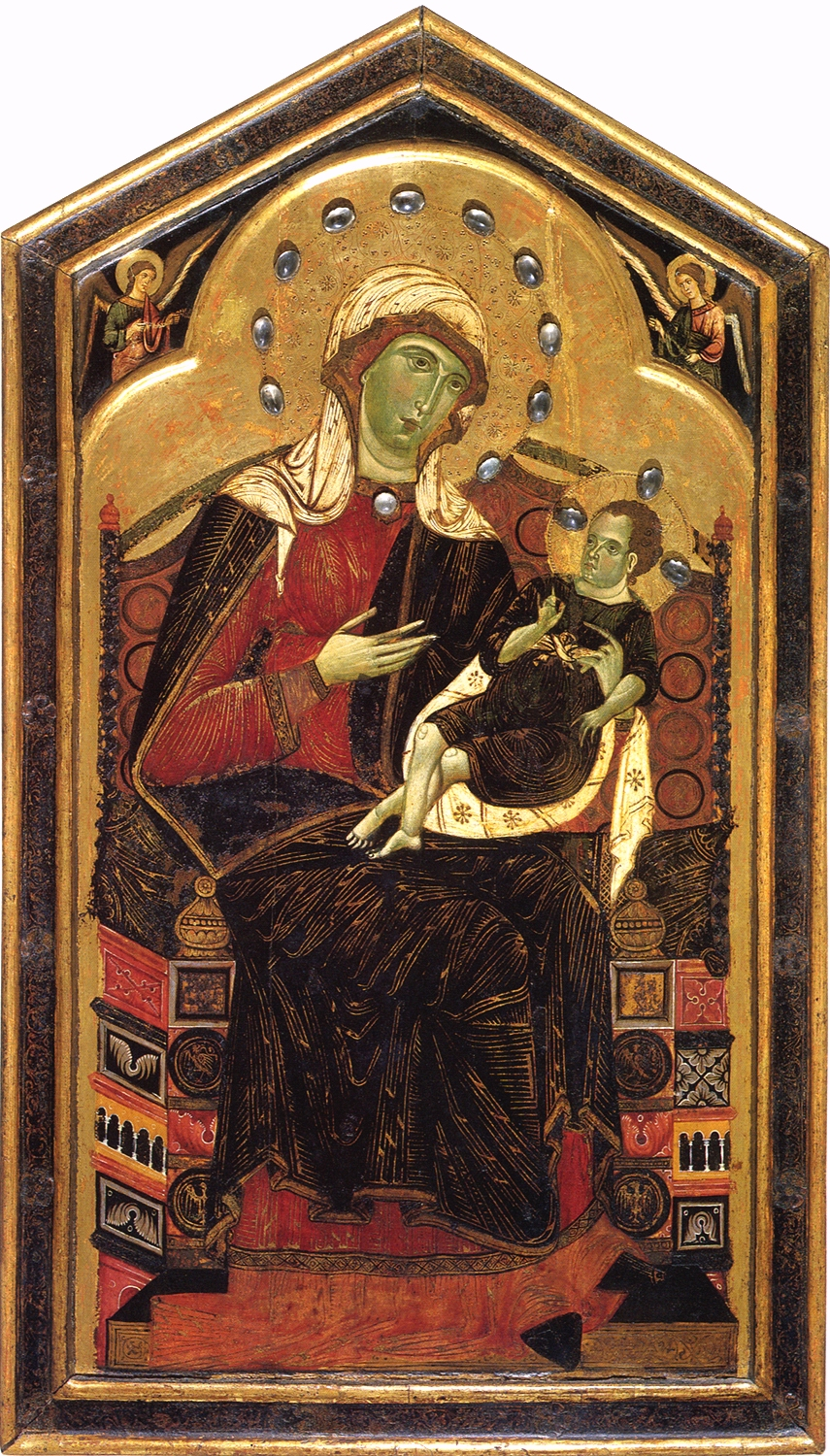
Madonna Galli-Dunn, c. 1265
(120 x 70 cm) Pinacoteca nazionale, Siena.

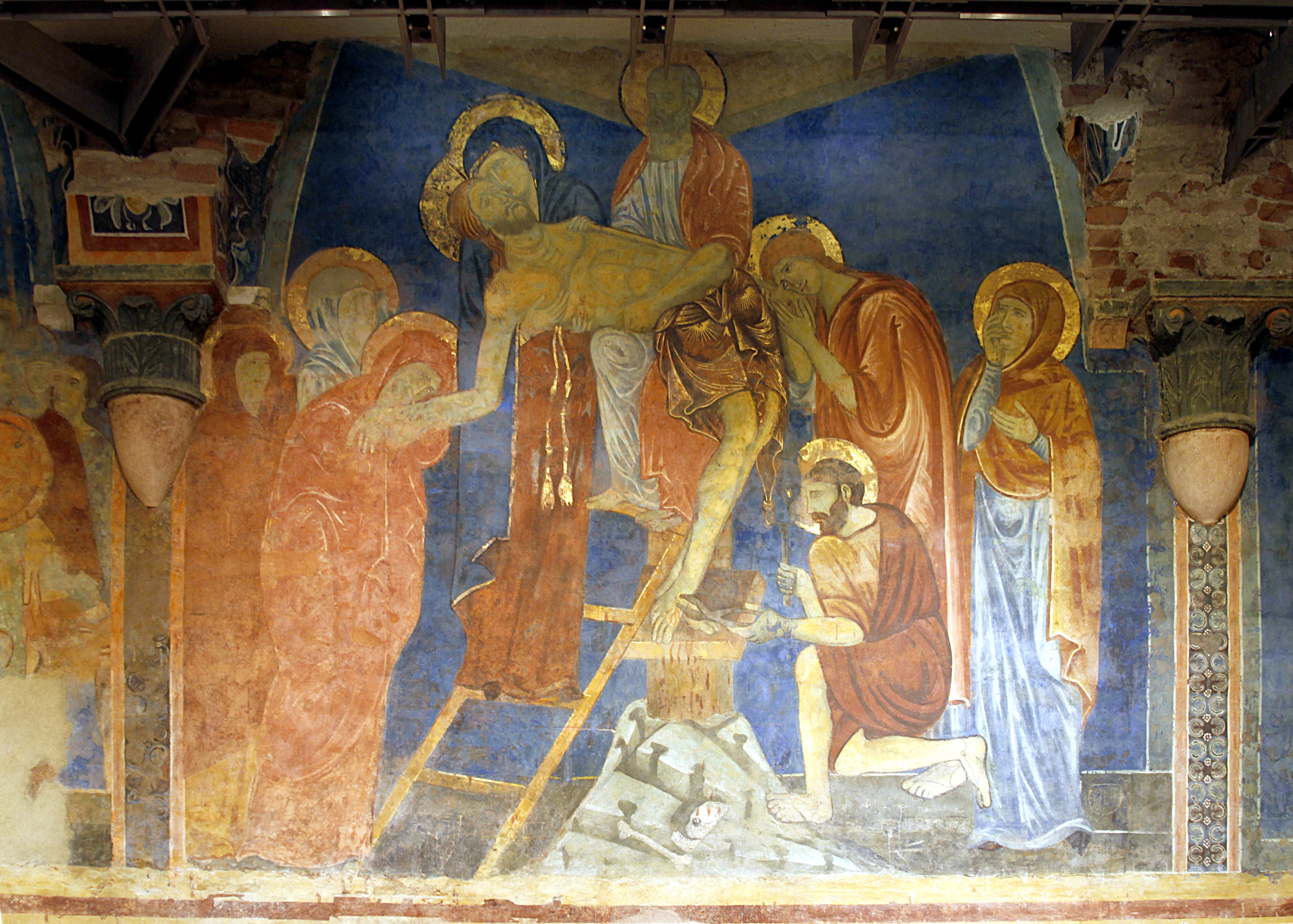
Fresco of Crucifixion, Siena
