= Madonna and Child with Saints Michael and Bernardino =

1476 triptych by Neroccio di Bartolomeo de' Landi

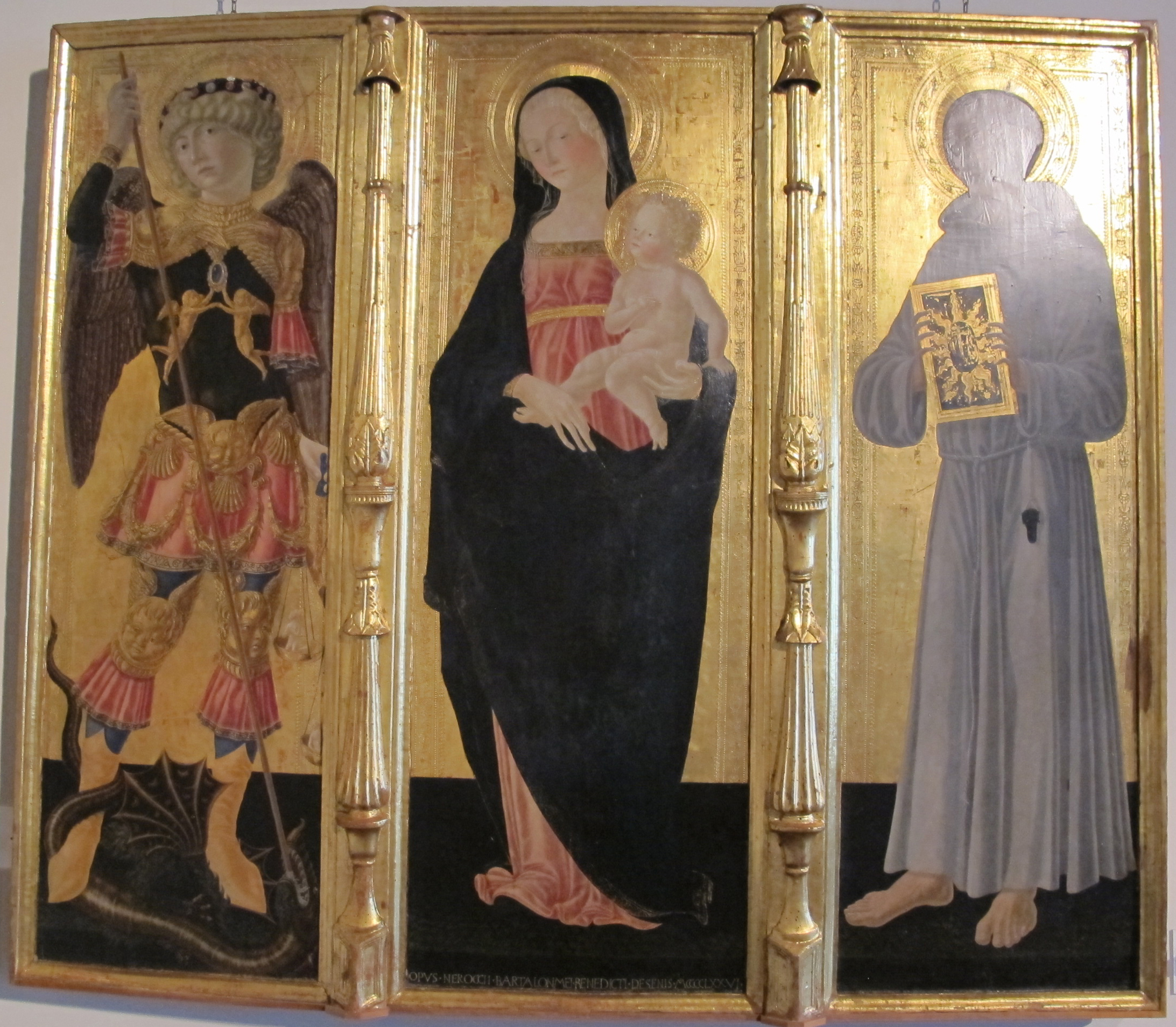

The Madonna and Child with Saints Michael and Bernardino is a triptych of 1476 in tempera and gold on panel by Neroccio di Bartolomeo de' Landi, now in the Pinacoteca Nazionale in Siena. To the left is the Archangel Michael, and to the right is Saint Bernardino of Siena.
