= Neroccio de' Landi =

Italian painter

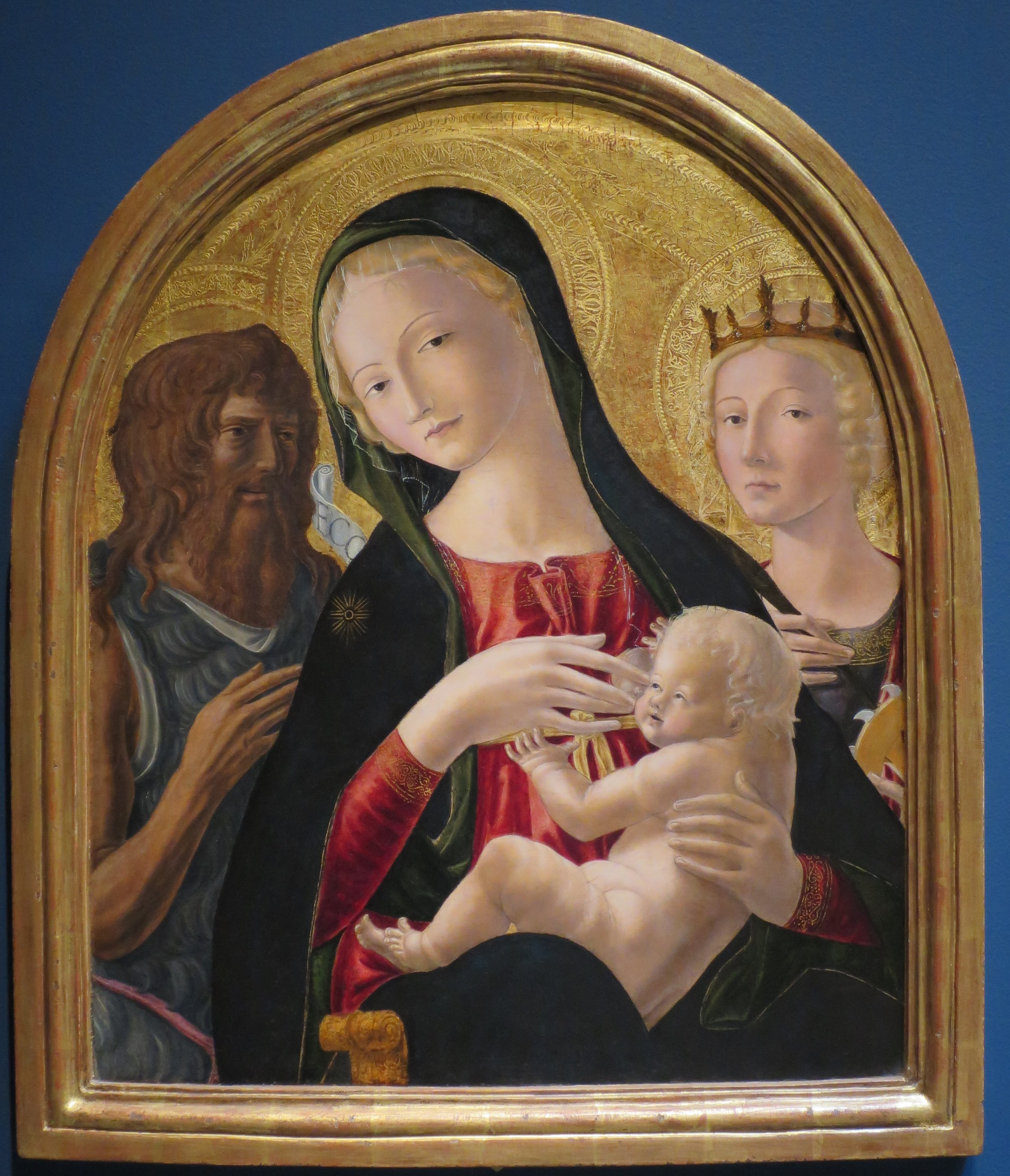
The Madonna and Child between John the Baptist and Saint Catherine

Neroccio di Bartolomeo de' Landi (1447–1500) was an Italian painter and sculptor of the early-Renaissance or Quattrocento period in Siena.

He was a student of Vecchietta, then he shared a studio with Francesco di Giorgio from 1468. He painted Scenes from the life of St Benedict, now in the Uffizi, probably in collaboration with di Giorgio, and Madonna and Child between Saint Jerome and Saint Bernard, which is in the Pinacoteca Nazionale of Siena. In 1472 he painted an Assumption for the abbey of Monte Oliveto Maggiore, and in 1475 created a statue of Saint Catherine of Siena for the Sienese church dedicated to her.

He separated from di Giorgio in 1475. In 1476, he painted Madonna and Child with St Michael and St Bernardino, a triptych now in the Pinacoteca Nazionale of Siena. In 1483, he designed the Hellespontine Sybil for the mosaic pavement of the Cathedral of Siena, and the tomb for Bishop Tommaso Piccolomini del Testa.

== See also ==
- The Virgin Recommends the City of Siena to Jesus
