= San Giovannino della Staffa, Siena =

Church building in Siena, Italy

Coordinates: 43.319019°N 11.334735°E

San Giovannino della Staffa, also known as San Giovannino in Pantaneto, is a Renaissance style Roman Catholic church on Piazetta Virgilio Grassi, in the Contrada del Leocorno, Siena, Tuscany, Italy.

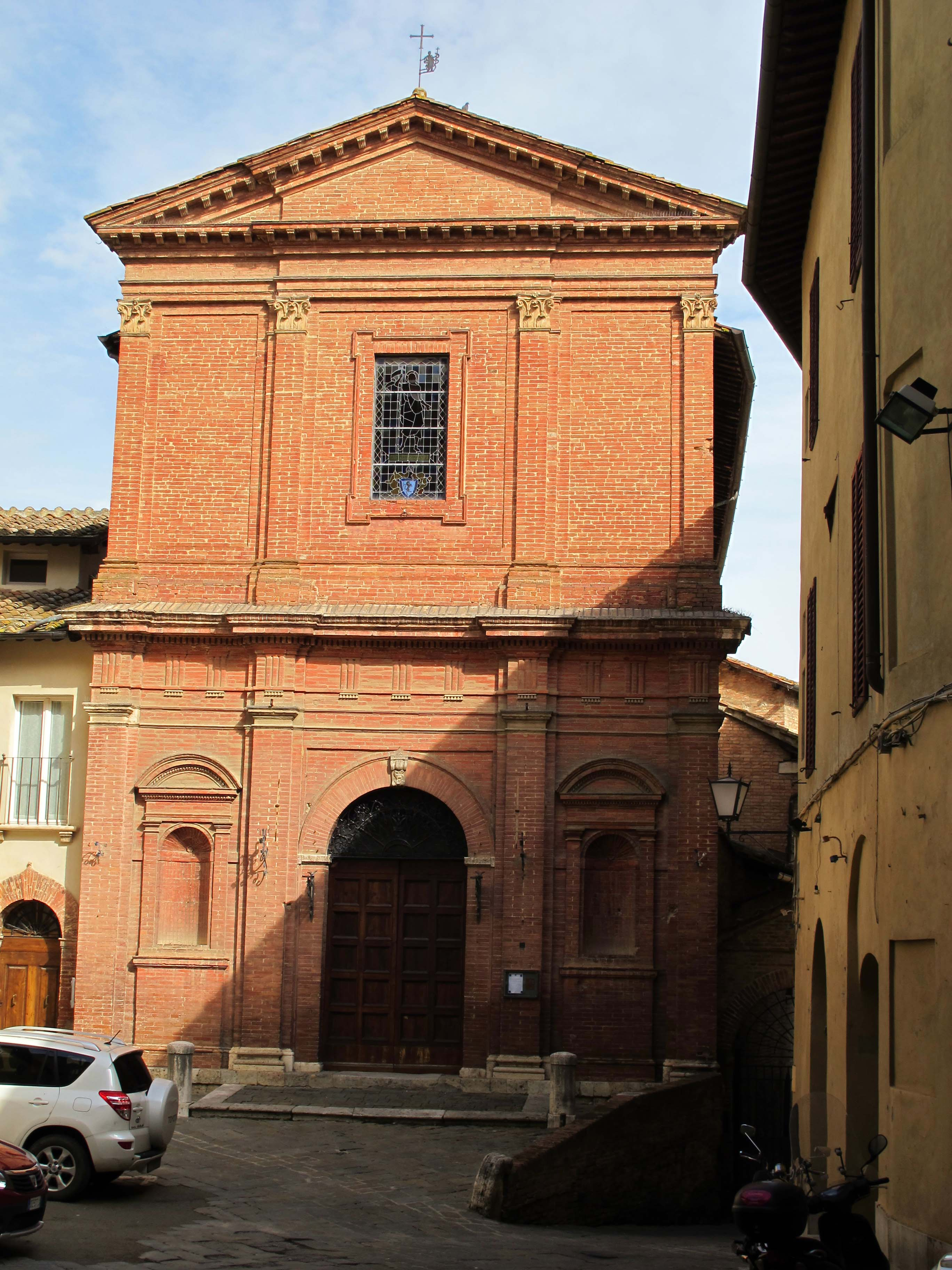
Facade

== History ==
A Romanesque, 13th-century church at the site was rebuilt in the first half of the 16th century. The church was dedicated to St John the Baptist, and the church or oratory was allied to a lay company of the same name. The architect may have been Giovanni Battista Pelori, a pupil of Baldassarre Peruzzi. The brick facade was completed by 1537. Completion of the body of the church was delayed until the 1590s. Fresco decoration of the interiors was commissioned from 1599 to 1649. The Contrada del Leocorno has been linked to the church for over three centuries.

Inside, the nave ceiling is frescoed with a Glory of St John the Baptist by Dionisio Montorselli. The nave walls have fifteen frescoes by diverse artists, depicting events in the Life of John the Baptist. The painters include Dionisio Montorselli (Annuciation), Rutilio Manetti (4 canvases including the main altarpiece of the Baptism of Christ, John the Baptist declares Christ to the Pharisees), Domenico Manetti, Giovan Battista Giustammiani, called il Francesino, (Burial of John the Baptist) Bernardino Mei (Decapitation of the Baptist); Raffaello Vanni (St Zacharius at the Temple), Deifebo Burbarini (St Francis), and Astolfo Petrazzi (Decapitation of Sts John and Ansano). Some works have been attributed to Angelo di Niccolò Tegliacci (Baptist led to Prison), Cristoforo Rustici, Niccolo Nasini, and Tornioli (Banquet of Herod).

The main altar (1609) was built by Flaminio del Turco. The church has a small 14th-century Madonna della Pace by Francesco di Vannuccio.

The vestibule of the church has a terracotta statue of the Baptist by Guidoccio Cozzarelli and a canvas of the Glory of St Joseph by Deifebo Burbarini.
