= Bob Jones University Museum & Gallery =

- Established: 1951
- Location: South Carolina, U.S.
- Type: Art
- Founder: Bob Jones Jr. Bob Jones Sr.

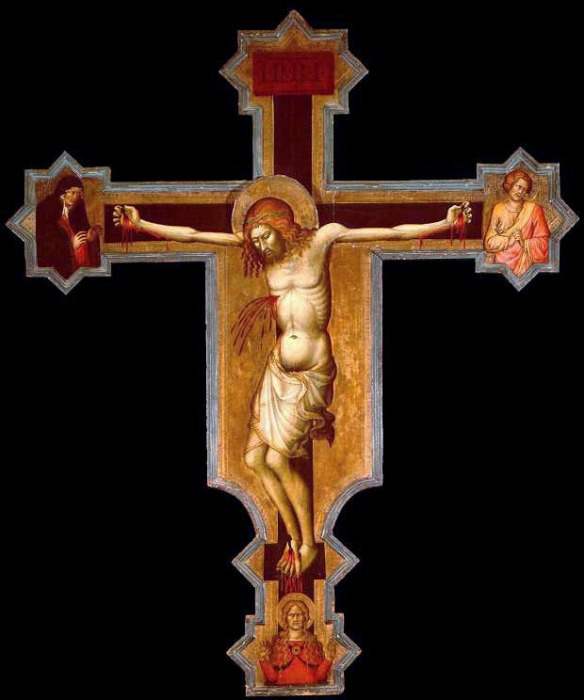
Francesco di Vannuccio, Crucifix, ca. 1370

The Museum & Gallery, Inc. is currently located on the campus of Bob Jones University in Greenville, South Carolina. It was established in 1951, and focuses on sacred art, mainly European Old Master paintings, but also includes smaller collections of sculpture, furniture, architectural elements, textiles, Greek and Russian icons, and ancient artifacts. In 2017, the museum is closed for a planned move to downtown Greenville, SC. As of 2026 the museum is still closed for renovations and seeking an alternate site.

== History ==
Bob Jones Jr., son and successor of Bob Jones Sr. who founded the university, started collecting art in 1948. An acquisition fund was created to buy religious art from the western world to build a collection to serve both the University and South Carolina. The collection opened on Thanksgiving Day in 1951 with 25 paintings on display in two galleries next to the Bowen Collection of Antiquities. Even at this small beginning, the collection included works by Sandro Botticelli, Domenico Ghirlandaio, Tintoretto, Paolo Veronese, and Jusepe de Ribera. The collection grew rapidly, and in 1956 it moved to the new Fine Arts building. By 1962 it contained more than 200 works of art. The seven Benjamin West paintings from the Progress of Revealed Religion series (commissioned by King George III) were acquired in 1963, and in 1965 the collection again moved, this time to the former dining hall of the university. In 1996, M&G became an independent corporation and ultimately changed its name in 2019 to Museum & Gallery, Inc.

In 2008, the Museum opened a second, smaller location in downtown Greenville at Heritage Green; however due to a lack of visitors and the need to review the collection's expansion and future, M&G chose to close the satellite location in 2017.

== Selected Old Master paintings ==
=== Italy ===
- Francesco di Vannuccio, Crucifix
- Bicci di Lorenzo, Madonna and Child with Angels
- Niccolò di Pietro Gerini, Madonna and Child with Saints
- Lorenzo di Niccolò di Martino, The Holy Trinity
- Baldassare di Biagio del Firenze and Matteo Civitali, Madonna and Child with Saints
- Master of the Greenville Tondo, Madonna and Child with Angels
- Sandro Botticelli, Madonna and Child with an Angel
- Pier Francesco Sacchi, The Adoration of the Shepherds
- Giovanni Filippo Criscuolo, The Last Judgment
- Francesco Granacci, Rest on the Flight into Egypt
- Marco d'Oggiono, Madonna of the Lake
- Ventura di Vincenzio Ulivieri, Ananias Restores Sight to Saul
- Il Sodoma, Procession to Calvary
- Andrea del Sarto, St. Sebastian
- Giovanni Lanfranco, St. Cecilia
- Tintoretto, The Visit of the Queen of Sheba to Solomon
- Salvator Rosa, Landscape with the Baptism of Christ
- Luca Giordano, Christ Cleansing the Temple
- Rutilio di Lorenzo Manetti, Christ Disputing with the Elders
- Carlo Dolci, Madonna and Child and The Repentant St. Peter
- Mattia Preti, Christ Seats the Child in the Midst of the Disciples
- Pompeo Batoni, St. James the Greater
- Ginevra Cantofoli, A Sibyl
- Domenichino, St. John the Evangelist
- Guido Reni, St. Matthew
- Giovanni Baglione, The Body of Christ Prepared for Burial
- Giuseppe Bartolomeo Chiari, The Return from the Flight into Egypt
- Sebastiano Conca, Justice and Temperance Overcoming Vice and Prudence and Fortitude Overcoming Evil
- Alessandro Magnasco, Monks before a Fireplace

=== Northern Europe ===
- Albrecht Bouts, The Man of Sorrows
- Colijn de Coter, St. Michael the Archangel and St. Agnes
- Master of the Holy Blood, Procession to Calvary
- Gerard David, The Risen Christ
- Master of St. Severin, Christ before Pilate
- Juan de Flandes, St. Augustine and St. Roch
- Jan Gossaert, The Virgin preparing the bath of the Child (also known as the Madonna of the Fireplace)
- Lucas Cranach, the Elder, Joab Slays Abner and Salomé with the head of John the Baptist
- Lucas Cranach, the Younger, Allegory on the Fall and Redemption of Man
- Jan van Scorel, Christ and the Samaritan Woman
- Jan van Amstel, called the Brunswick Monogrammist, Ecce Homo
- Joachim Bueckelaer, The Holy Family
- Jan Swart van Groningen, Nativity Triptych
- Hans von Aachen, The Adoration of the Shepherds
- Joos van Winghe, The Adoration of the Shepherds
- Cornelis Cornelisz. van Haarlem, Christ Healing the Blind Man
- Abraham Janssens, Lamentation over the Dead Christ
- Peter Paul Rubens, Christ on the Cross
- Gaspar de Crayer, St. Augustine
- Gerrit van Honthorst, The Holy Family in the Carpenter Shop
- Jan Hermansz. van Bijlert, St. Mary Magdalene Turning from the World to Christ
- Anthony van Dyck, Madonna and Child
- Matthias Stom, Lot Leaving Sodom
- Jan Boeckhorst, The Adoration of the Magi
- Govaert Flinck, Solomon's Prayer for Wisdom
- Gerbrand van den Eeckhout, Joseph Interpreting the Dreams of Pharaoh's Butler and Baker
- Jan Victors, Esther Accusing Haman

=== Spain ===
- Vincente Juan Macip, Pentecost
- Jusepe de Ribera, The Entombment of Christ and Ecce Homo
- Francisco Herrera the Elder, St. Catherine of Alexandria Appearing to the Family of St. Bonaventura
- Bartolomé Esteban Murillo, The Martyrdom of St. Andrew and The Heavenly Shepherd
- José Antolínez, St. Michael the Archangel Overcoming Satan

=== France ===
- Antoine de Lonhy, Presentation in the Temple
- Trophime Bigot, St. Sebastian Aided by St. Irene
- Simon Vouet, King David Playing the Harp and Salome with the Head of St. John the Baptist
- Sébastien Bourdon, The Hiding of Moses
- Philippe de Champaigne, The Christ of Derision
- Charles Le Brun, Pentecost
- François de Troy, Christ and the Samaritan Woman
- Jean Baptiste Jouvenet, Christ with the Roman Centurion
- Pierre Hubert Subleyras, Christ in the House of the Pharisee
- Félix Louis Leullier, The Martyrdom of St. Perpetua and St. Felicitas

=== Great Britain ===
- Edward Matthew Ward, Martin Luther Discovering Justification by Faith
- Eyre Crowe, Wittenberg, October 31, 1517
- Edwin Long, Vashti Refuses the King's Summons and Sir Henry Irving as Richard, Duke of Gloucester
- Benjamin West, 7 paintings from the series "The Progress of Revealed Religion"
- Frederic James Shields, Patience

=== United States ===
- John Koch, Julius Weitzner

== Gallery ==
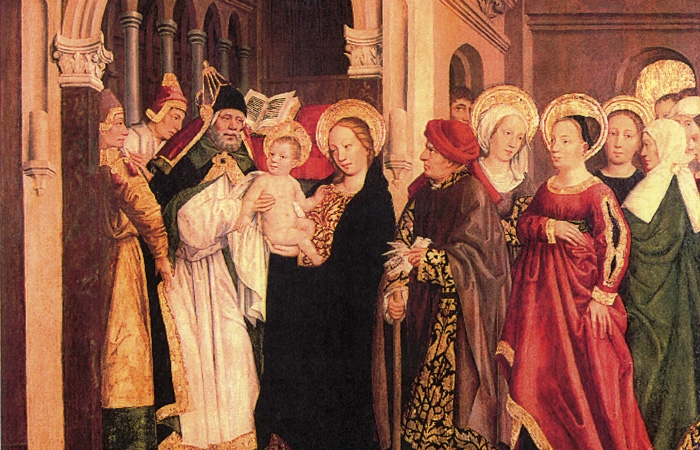
Antoine de Lonhy, Presentation in the Temple, ca. 1480

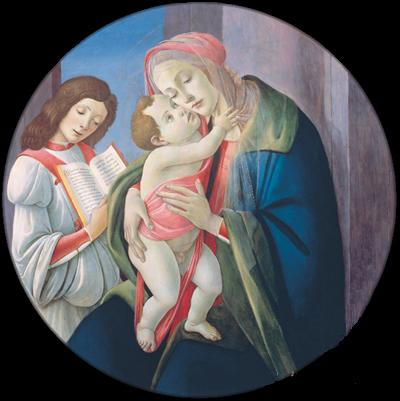
Sandro Botticelli, Madonna and Child with an Angel, ca. 1490

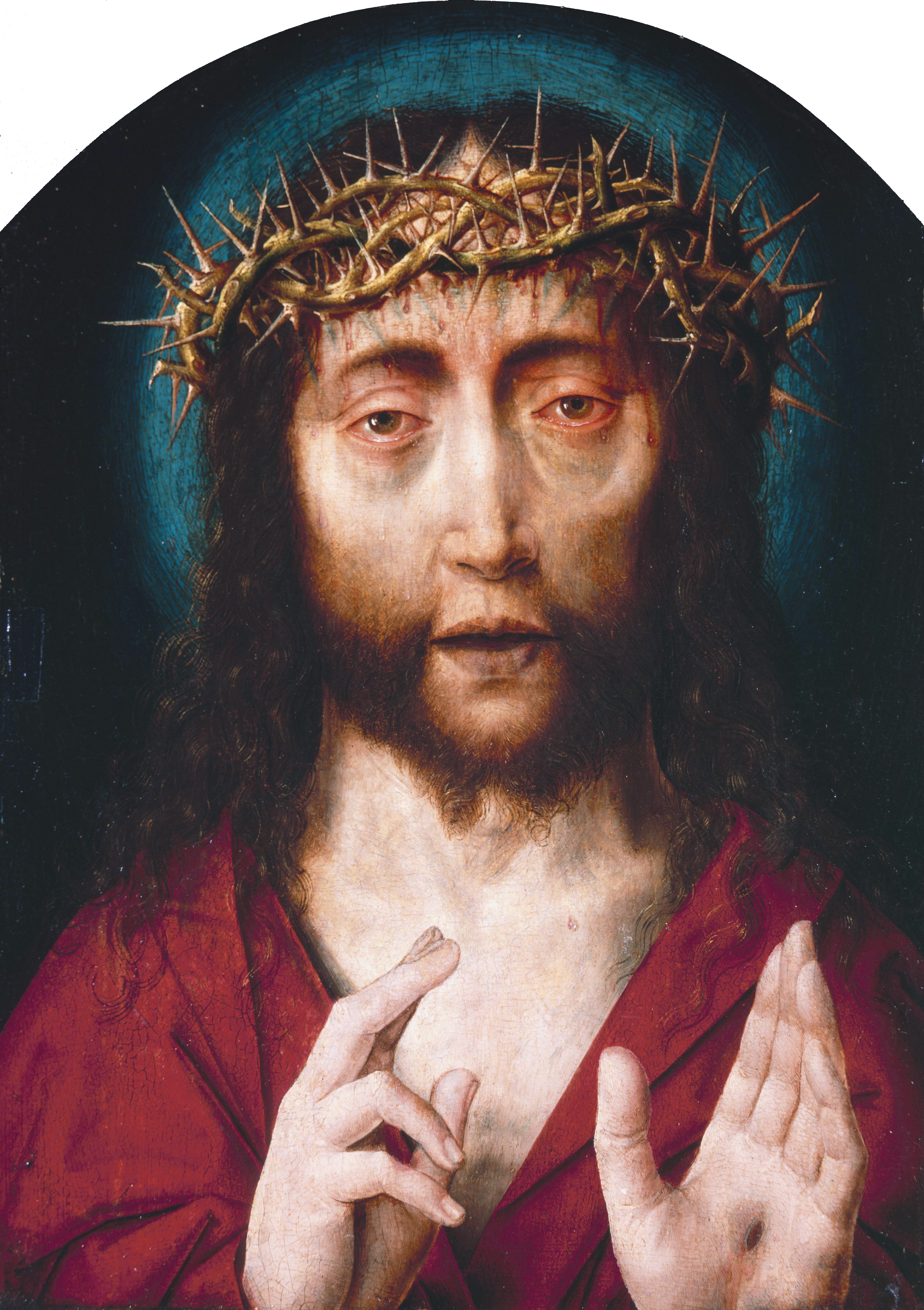
Albrecht Bouts, The Man of Sorrows, ca. 1500

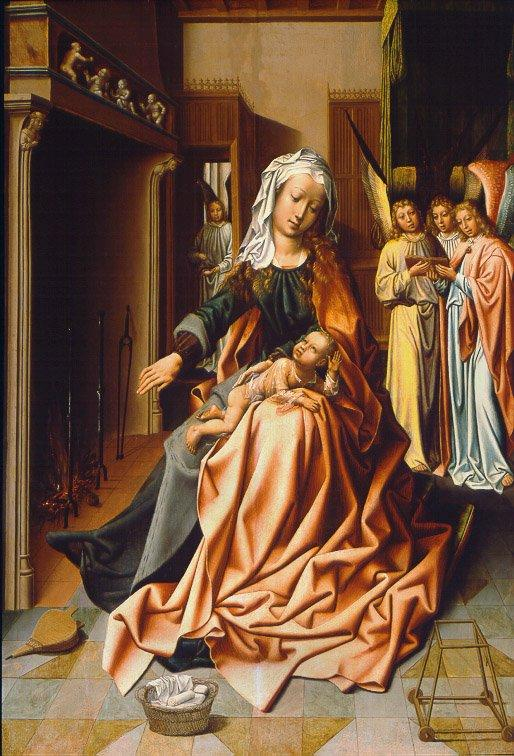
Jan Gossaert, The Virgin preparing the bath of the Child, ca. 1515

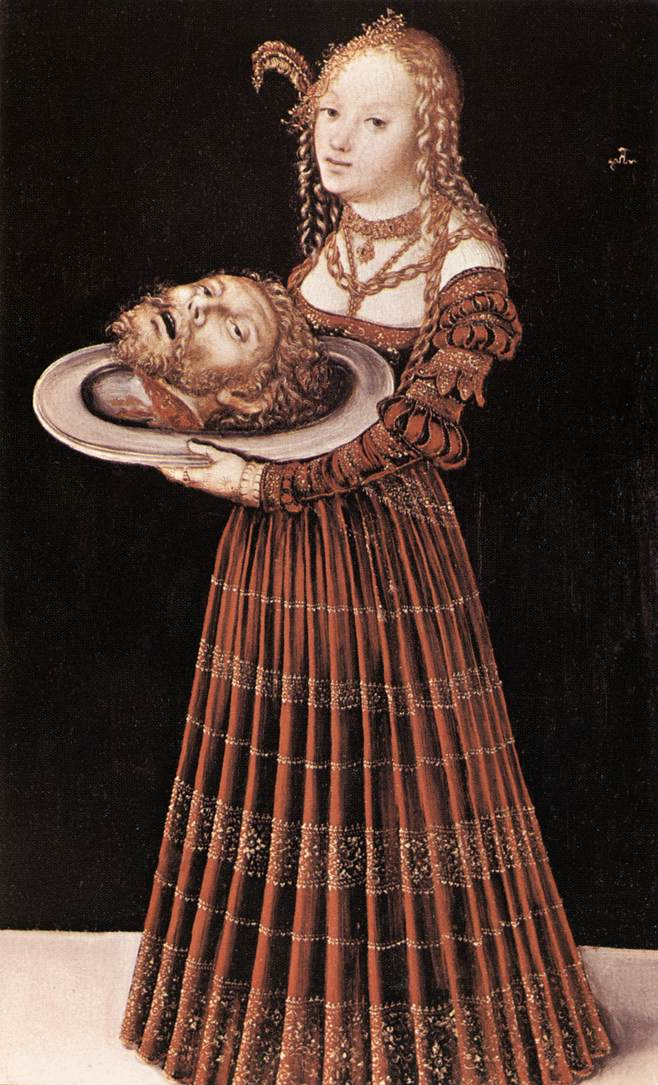
Lucas Cranach, the Elder, Salomé with the head of John the Baptist, first half of the 16th century

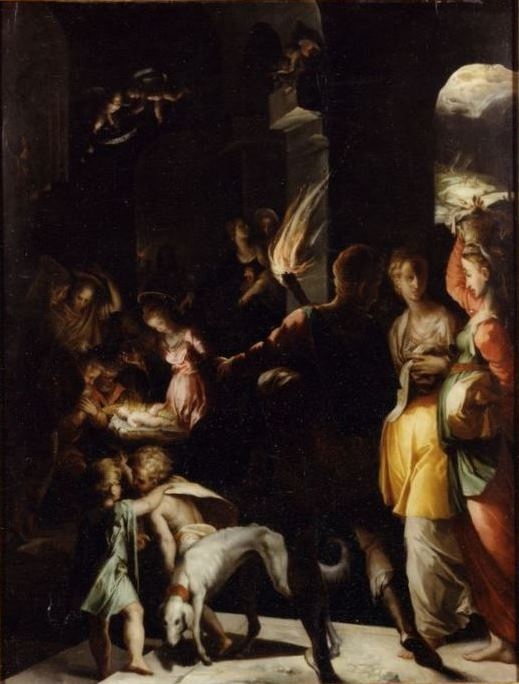
Joos van Winghe, The Adoration of the Shepherds

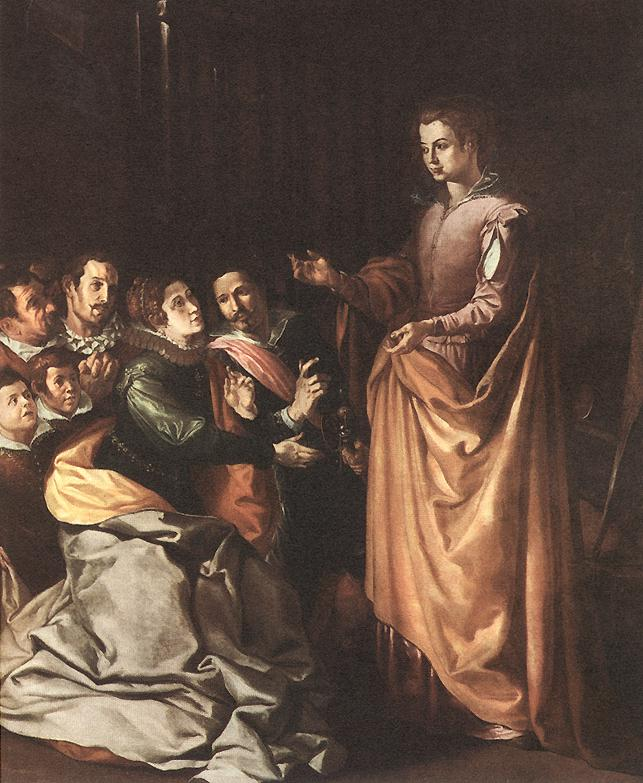
Francisco Herrera the Elder, St. Catherine of Alexandria Appearing to the Family of St. Bonaventura, 1629

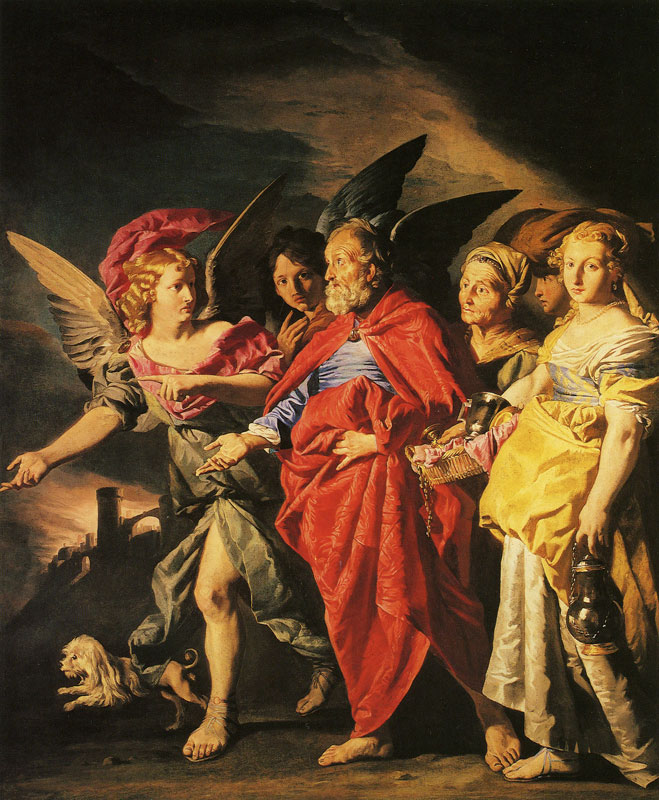
Matthias Stom, Lot Leaving Sodom, ca. 1630

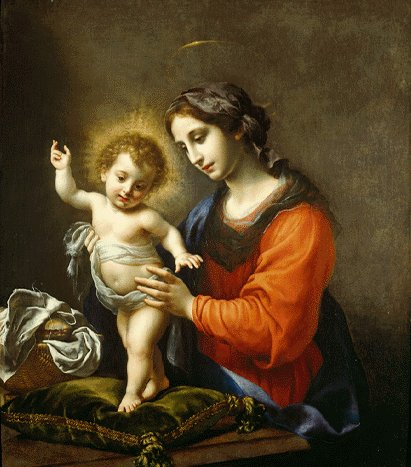
Carlo Dolci, Virgin and Child, 1640s

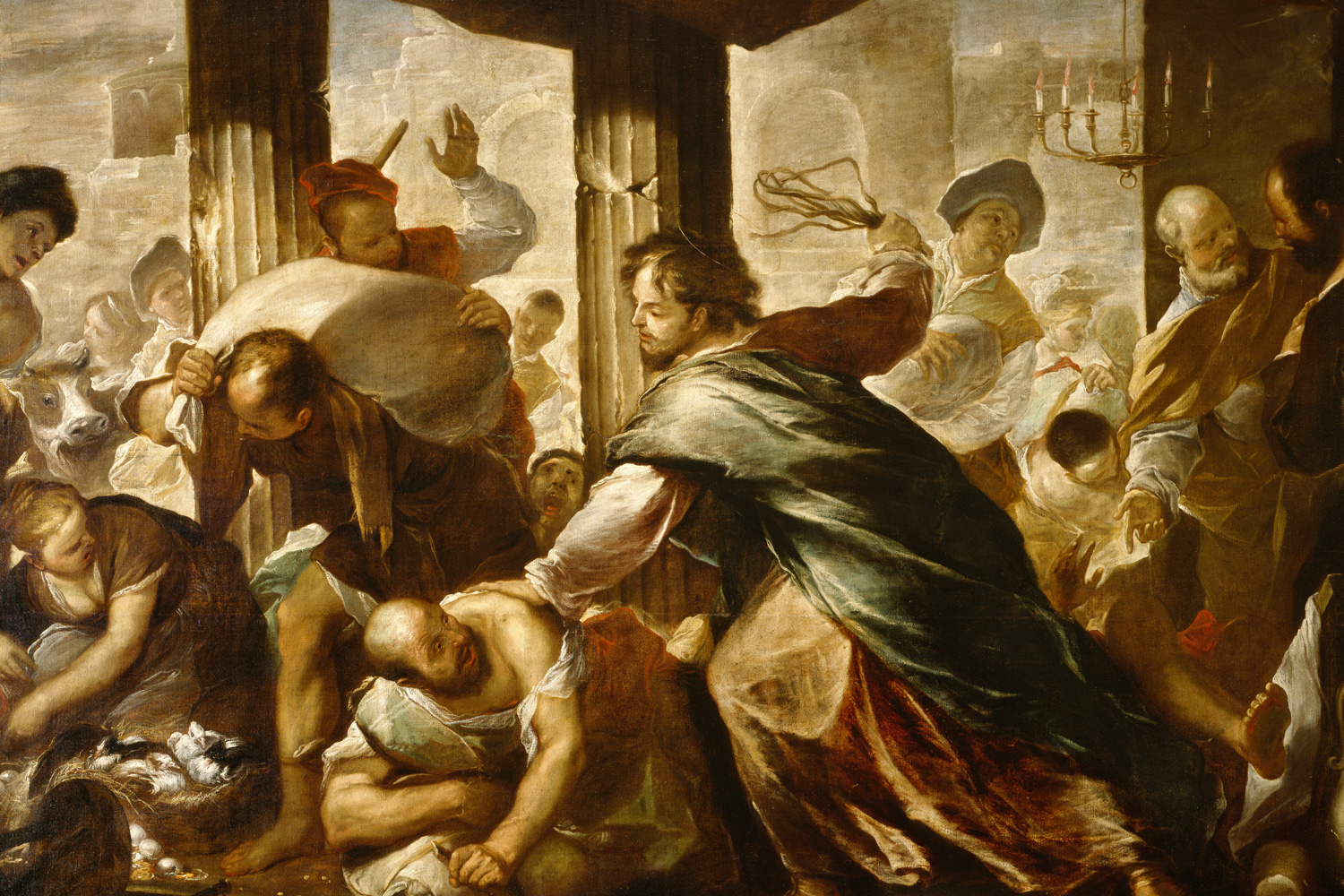
Luca Giordano, Christ Cleansing the Temple

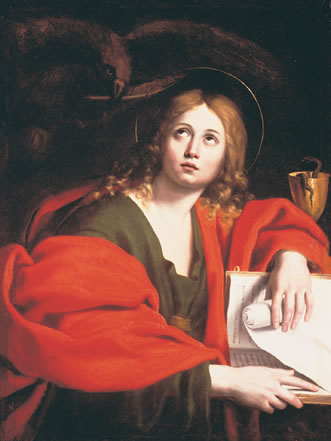
Domenichino, St. John the Evangelist

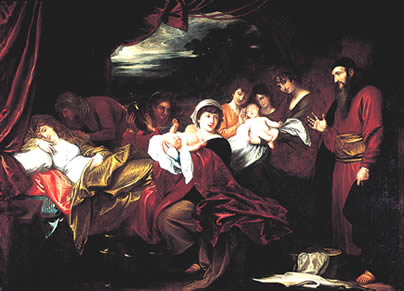
Benjamin West, Esau and Jacob Presented to Isaac

== Notes ==
34.87587797667941°N 82.36191534466919°W
