= Diocesan Museum (Genoa) =

Diocesan Museum of Genoa
- Museo Diocesano di Genova
- Established: 16 December 2000
- Location: Genova
- Coordinates: 44.4079287°N 8.9296586°E
- Type: Diocesan museum
- Website: Official Museum Website (in Italian)

The Diocesan museum of Genoa is located in Genova in the region of Liguria. It is found inside the old residence of the canons of the Cathedral of San Lorenzo and is accessible through the cloister of San Lorenzo. The cloister, built in the 12th century, is characterized by two levels of arches resting on double Romanesque columns with leaved capitals. In the 17th century two sides of the building were modified, with the double columns substituted with heavy pilasters in order to support the above two floors constructed for additional space. The museum houses objects from the diocese of Genoa and the surrounding area, including sculptures, paintings, frescoes, illuminated manuscripts, and a series of liturgical items, as well as an archeological area.

== History ==
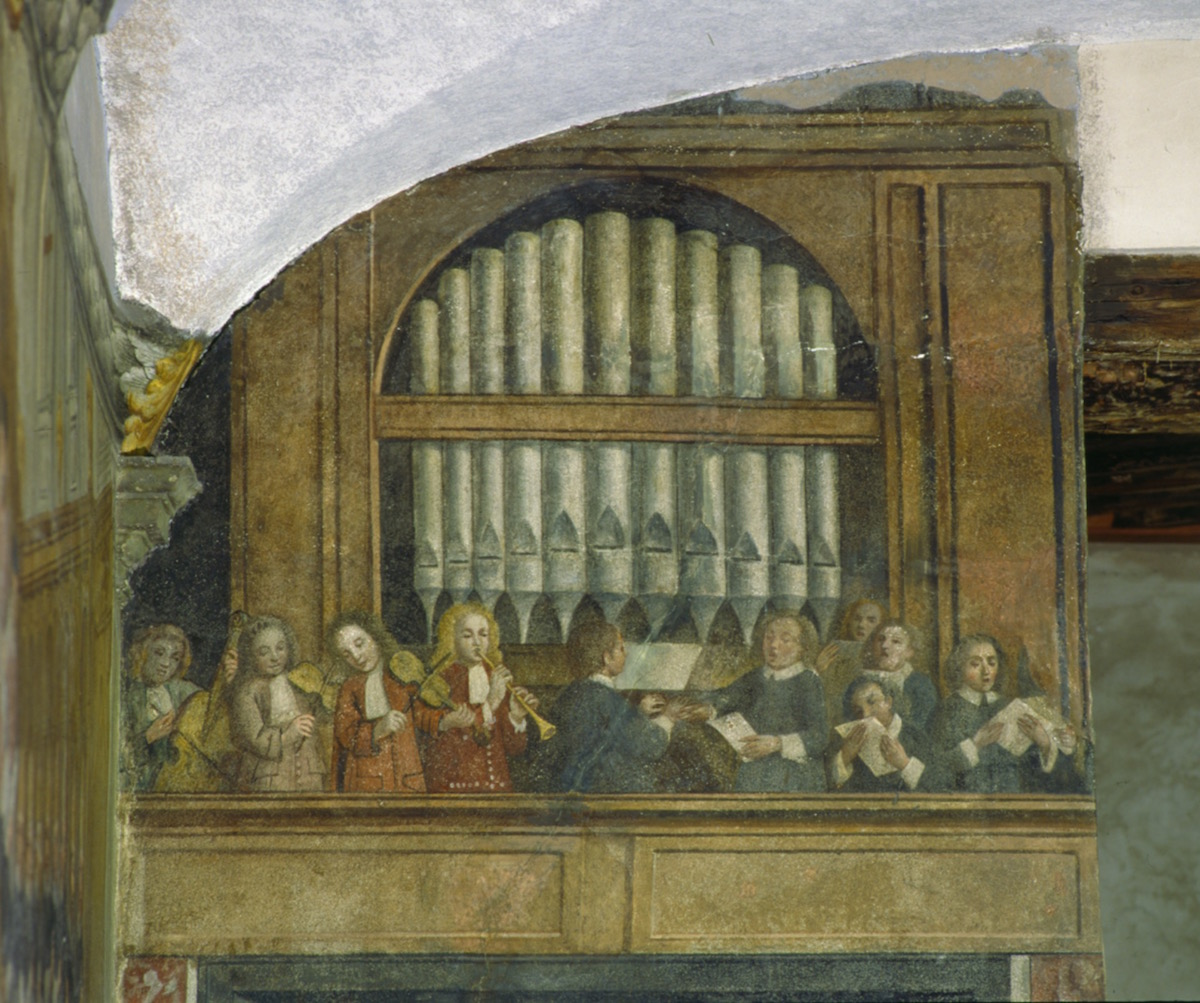
Fresco

The museum was inaugurated on 16 December 2000, with its main entrance in the cloister. The building, erected on a Roman foundation between 1176 and 1184 as the residence of the canons of the cathedral and incorporating the old bishop's residence, is connected to the cloister by a passageway. The cloister was restored with funds from the Columbus Citizens Foundation, saving the old structure and adapting it for the museum.

== Works ==
The museum offers the visitor a chance to learn more about the city through its archeological section as well as the works documenting the storia of the Genovese church.

=== The underground rooms ===
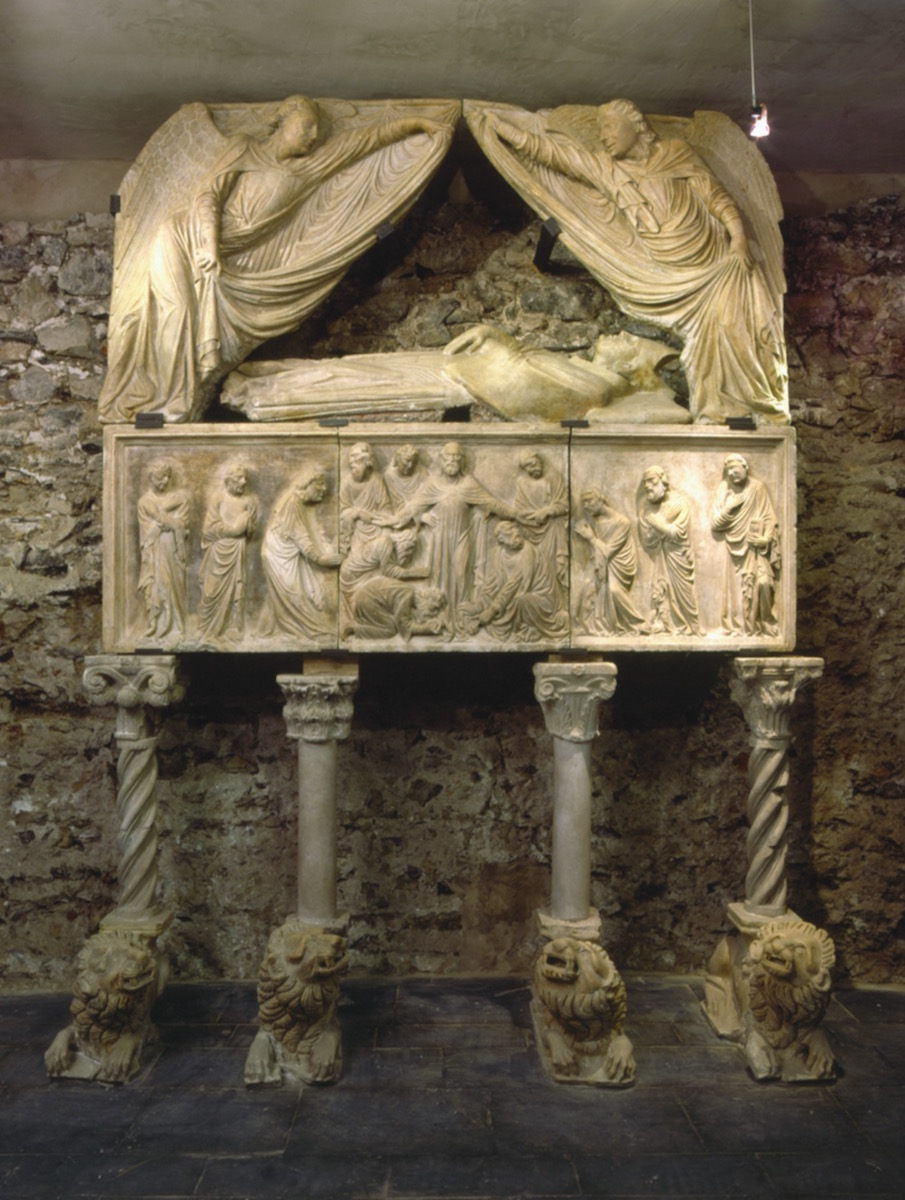
Funeral monument of Cardinal Luca Fieschi

The visit begins underground where archeological finds from the region are displayed. The oldest items in the museum's collection are found here and include a comb made out of bone from the 4th-6th centuries, as well as a fragment from a Roman sarcophagus. Also found here is the funeral monument of Cardinal Luca Fieschi (c.1336) from the school of Giovanni di Balduccio of Pisa.

=== 14th- and 15th-century painting ===
Ligurian painting of the 14th and 15th centuries is represented by works of great historical-artistic interest, including:

- Polyptych of St Bartholomew (14th century), by Barnaba da Modena;
- Polyptych of the Trinity, by an anonymous Genoan painter known as the Master of Santa Maria delle Vigne;
- Fragment of a fresco (1468) from the Marini Chapel of the cathedral, by Cristoforo De' Mottis

=== 16th-century painting ===
The evolution of the human figure in art, from the late Gothic to the Renaissance, is represented by a notable sequence of paintings from which stand out:

- Polyptych of St Lazzaro (first half of the 16th century) by Pier Francesco Sacchi, from the church of St Lazzaro (now destroyed);
- Dossal showing the Stories of St John the Baptist (first half of the 16th century), by Teramo Piaggio e Andrea Semino;
- Pietà with St John the Baptist and St Nicholas of Tolentino (first half of the 16th century) by Agostino Bombelli
- Madonna with the Child Jesus enthroned and saints, attributed to Perin del Vaga;
- Crucifixion by Luca Cambiaso.

=== 16th century liturgical works ===
Among liturgical items of the 16th century are included: an antependium with an embroidered image of Grief over the dead Christ (c.1515) from Flanders.

Metalworks include: a silver urn (embossed and etched, and partly gold-plated), made my Genovese silver and donated in 1615 to the church of St Siro da Placidia Doria; an embossed silver reliquary of the hand of St Stephen (12th century but with modifications from the 15th century); a series of washbasins (15th-16th centuries) in embossed brass, etched and with punching, of German manufacture.

=== Baroque art ===
The final section is dedicated to Baroque art; the commissions related to devotion play a key role both in the development of painting, and in the applied arts (textiles, jewelry, wooden sculptures, etc.). These include: the Madonna of Loreto by Domenico Fiasella; the transitus of St Scholastica and Tobias buries the dead, both by Gregorio de Ferrari.

== Bibliography ==
- Giacomini Miari Erminia e Mariani Paola, Musei religiosi in Italia, Milano 2005, pp. 115 – 116
- Zuffi Stefano, I Musei Diocesani in Italia. Primo volume, Palazzolo sull'Oglio (BS) 2003, pp. 15 – 21

== Related links ==
- Arcidiocesi di Genova
- Cattedrale di San Lorenzo (Genova)
- Museo del Tesoro della Cattedrale di San Lorenzo di Genova
