= Staffa (disambiguation) =

Stafa may refer to:

== Places ==
- Staffa, an island of the Inner Hebrides in Argyll and Bute, Scotland
- Stäffa, also known as Stäfa, a municipality in the district of Meilen in the canton of Zürich in Switzerland.
- Staffa, Ontario, a municipality in Ontario, Canada, situated in Western Perth County, just west of the city of Stratford

== People ==
- Dino Staffa (1906–1977), Italian Cardinal of the Roman Catholic Church
- Giuseppe Staffa (1807–1877), Italian composer and conductor

== Buildings ==
- San Giovannino della Staffa, Siena, an Italian Renaissance style, Roman Catholic church
