= San Vigilio, Siena =

Roman Catholic church in Siena, Italy

Coordinates: 43.31964°N 11.333158°E

San Vigilio is a Renaissance and Baroque style, Roman Catholic church located on Via San Vigilio, Siena, region of Tuscany, Italy. The exterior has a sober classical facade, while the interior has rich Baroque decorations. The church is dedicated to the Bishop and martyr St Vigilius; it now serves as the chapel for the University of Siena. It stands across the street from the Castellare Ugurgieri, and down the street from the Palazzo Bandini Piccolomini found on the junction with Via Sallustio Bandini.

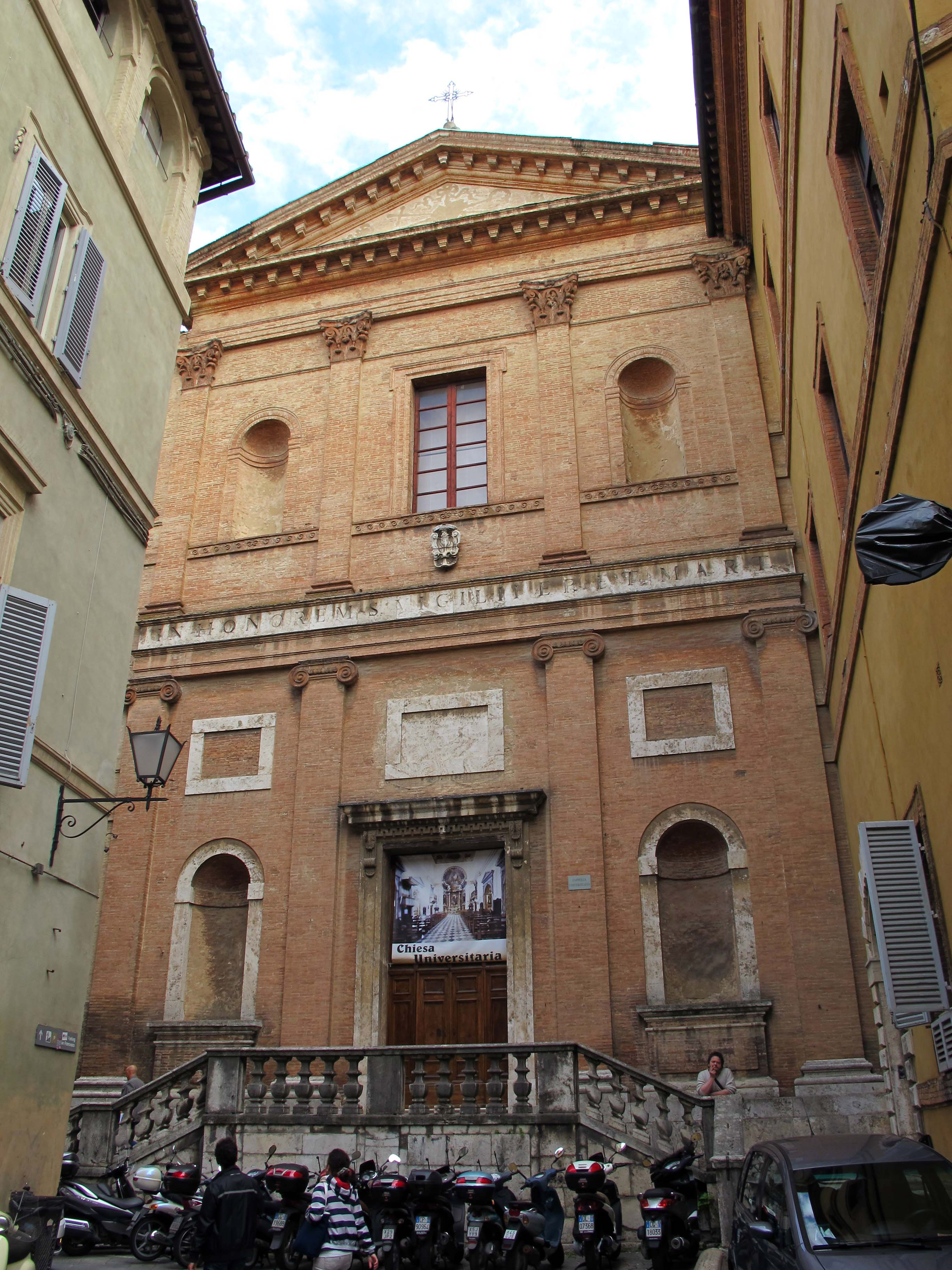
San Vigilio

== History ==
The building was initially a parish church built by the Ugurgieri family. The structure was occupied by the 11th century with monks of the Camaldolese order, who had a convent adjacent to the church. That building burned in a fire in 1153, and was reconstructed by 1231. In 1420, the monks were expelled. In 1556, the church was ceded to the Jesuit order. They rebuilt the church in 1561, which they continued to refurbish until 1775. When the Jesuits were suppressed in 1759, the church was acquired by the Vallombrosan order, who had the facade rebuilt in the present brick form by the architect Antonio Matteucci.

In turn when the Vallombrosan order was suppressed, in 1816, the Grand Duke of Tuscany gifted the church to the University of Siena.

The interior is decorated with 15 canvases by Raffaello Vanni depicting The Last Judgement. The third chapel on the left has busts depicting Pietro De Vecchi and his wife Giulia Verdelli by Giuseppe Mazzuoli. The bronze crucifix is attributed to Pietro Tacca. The chapel also has a sepulchral monument to Antonio Rospigliosi, nephew of Pope Clement IX; the monument was sculpted by Giovanni Antonio Mazzuoli.

The chapel of St Francis Borgia was painted by Dionisio Montorselli. In the chapel of St Anne a canvas was painted by Romanelli.

In the chapel of the Taja family, bronze figures of St Ignatius, St Bernardino, and the Blessed Giovanni Colombino were completed by the studio of Gianlorenzo Bernini. The works were commissioned by Cardinal Flaminio Taja.

The chapel of St Francis Xavier has canvases by Francesco Vanni, and Baldassare Franceschini. The chapel of the Madonna di Loreto is decorated with canvases by Francesco Vanni, depicting the Assumption of the Virgin and Translation of the House.

The main altarpiece depicting the Glory of St Ignatius was painted by Mattia Preti. Flanking the painting are two canvases by Francesco Vanni depicting Louis Gonzaga and Stanislaus Kostka. The sepulchral monument of Marcello Biringucci was completed by Bartolomeo Mazzuoli.
