= Santa Maria in Provenzano, Siena =

Collegiate church in Siena, Tuscany, Italy

Coordinates: 43.3209°N 11.3326°E

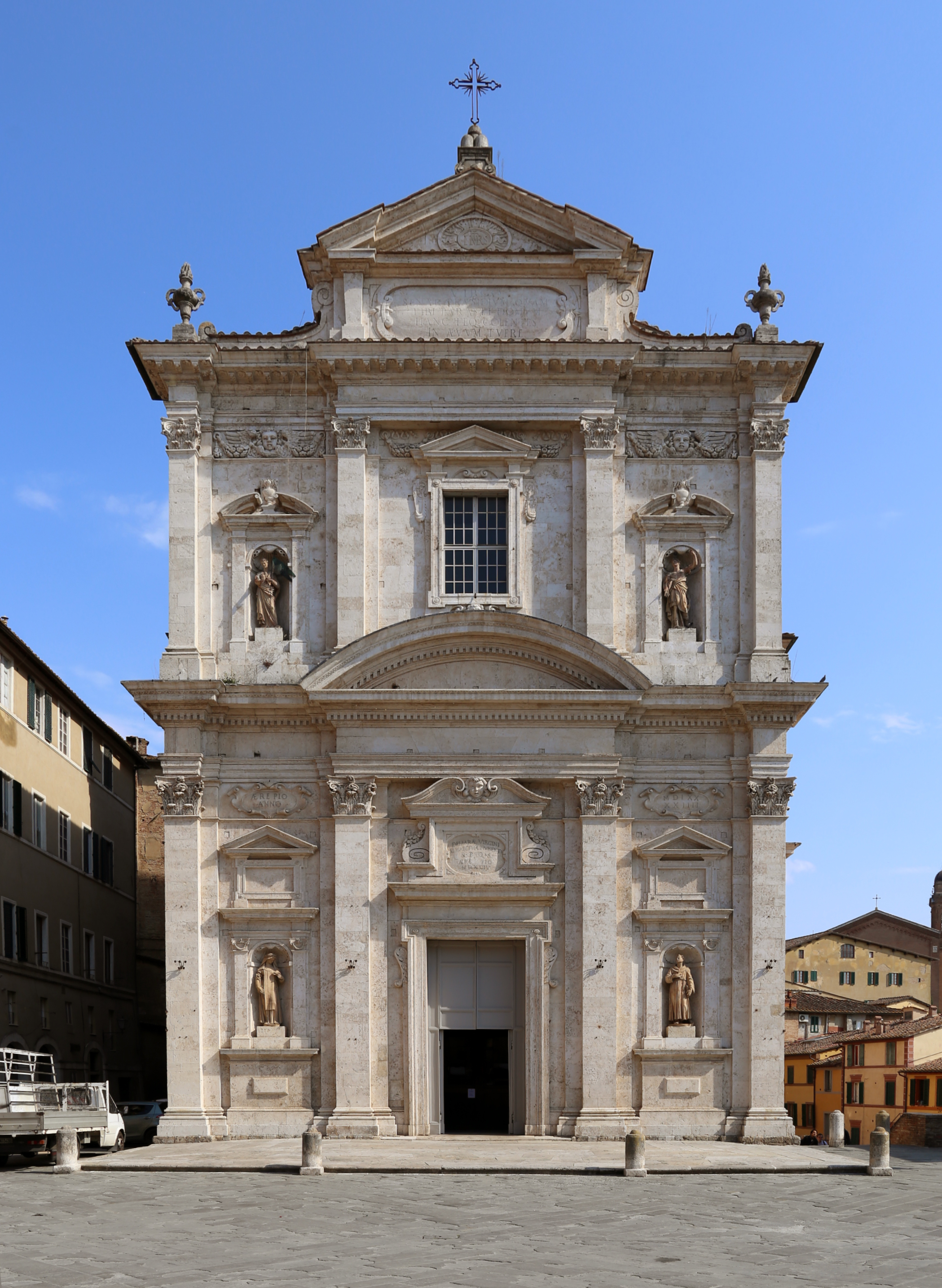
Façade

Santa Maria in Provenzano, or the Insigne Collegiata di Santa Maria in Provenzano, is a late-Renaissance-Baroque style, Roman Catholic, collegiate church in Piazza Provenzano Salvani, in the Terza Camollia, just southwest of the basilica of San Francesco, in the city of Siena, region of Tuscany, Italy. This Marian shrine was built around a 14th-century terracotta icon of the Madonna, which was credited with miracles. The Palio of Siena takes place on the day of veneration of this Marian devotion.

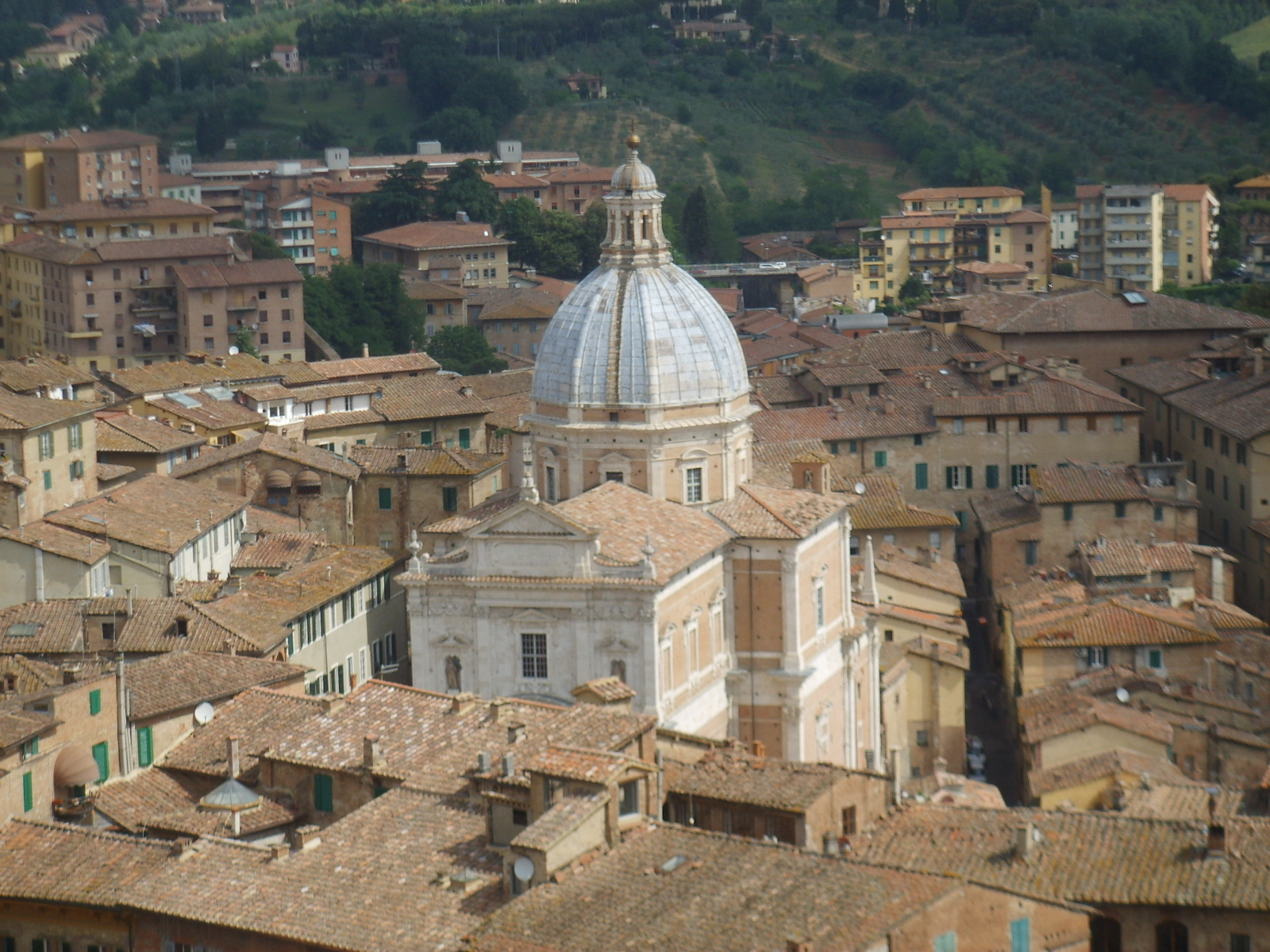
Remote view with the dome

== History ==
The church was consecrated on October 16, 1611 by the archbishop Camillo Borghesi. The image, which originally was in an aedicule on a wall next to a house, was carried by a procession (translated) into the church on this day. The event was painted by Taddeo Gregori. This painting is presently in the Sacristy of the Collegiata. The procession's members included the widowed former grand-duchess Cristina of Lorraine and the reigning Grand-Duchess Maria Maddalena d'Austria.

A number of omens and events had fortified faith in the power of the 14th-century icon. Brandano, il pazzo di Cristo (the madman of Christ), had prophesied before 1555:

Siena, I see your evils and cannot heal you, because God is too angry with you, Siena! ... Run the Signoria through the sieve, or it will go into the brothel! Siena! ... Send your daughters barefoot to do penance in Provenzano, because a great drowning flood nears... Senesi! Your well-being rests with Provenzano and our Majestic Queen who has guarded Siena, and will protect her forever

Tradition holds that the lackluster faith of the Sienese led the Madonna to quit her protection, resulting in the ultimate subjugation of Siena by the Holy Roman Emperor and his Florentine allies. The Madonna di Provenzano terracotta was shattered. This was said to have resulted from either an errant or impertinent shot by a Spanish soldier in the occupying army of the Holy Roman Emperor Charles V. According to legend, the event caused a change on the soldier. He either died or repented from the event.

Fifty years later, this neighborhood was considered one of the most morally insalubrious corners of town. An old prostitute from the neighborhood prayed to the icon of the Madonna, and overnight her ulcerous lesion was healed.

The image became a destination for devotion of the faithful. Soon the church relented and in 1594 commissioned construction of a church as a shrine for the icon; the architect Flaminio Del Turco was hired to design it. The Medici family were among the patrons who raised funds to build the new church. In 1806 the image was covered with a coating of silver, which was done out of respect and a desire to preserve the icon. Through conservation of the work, the silver has been partially revealed.

In 1634 Pope Urban VIII named this as a collegiate church with its own chapter of canons.

In 1681, the image was solemnly crowned with a Papal Bull from Pope Innocent XI

== Art and architecture ==
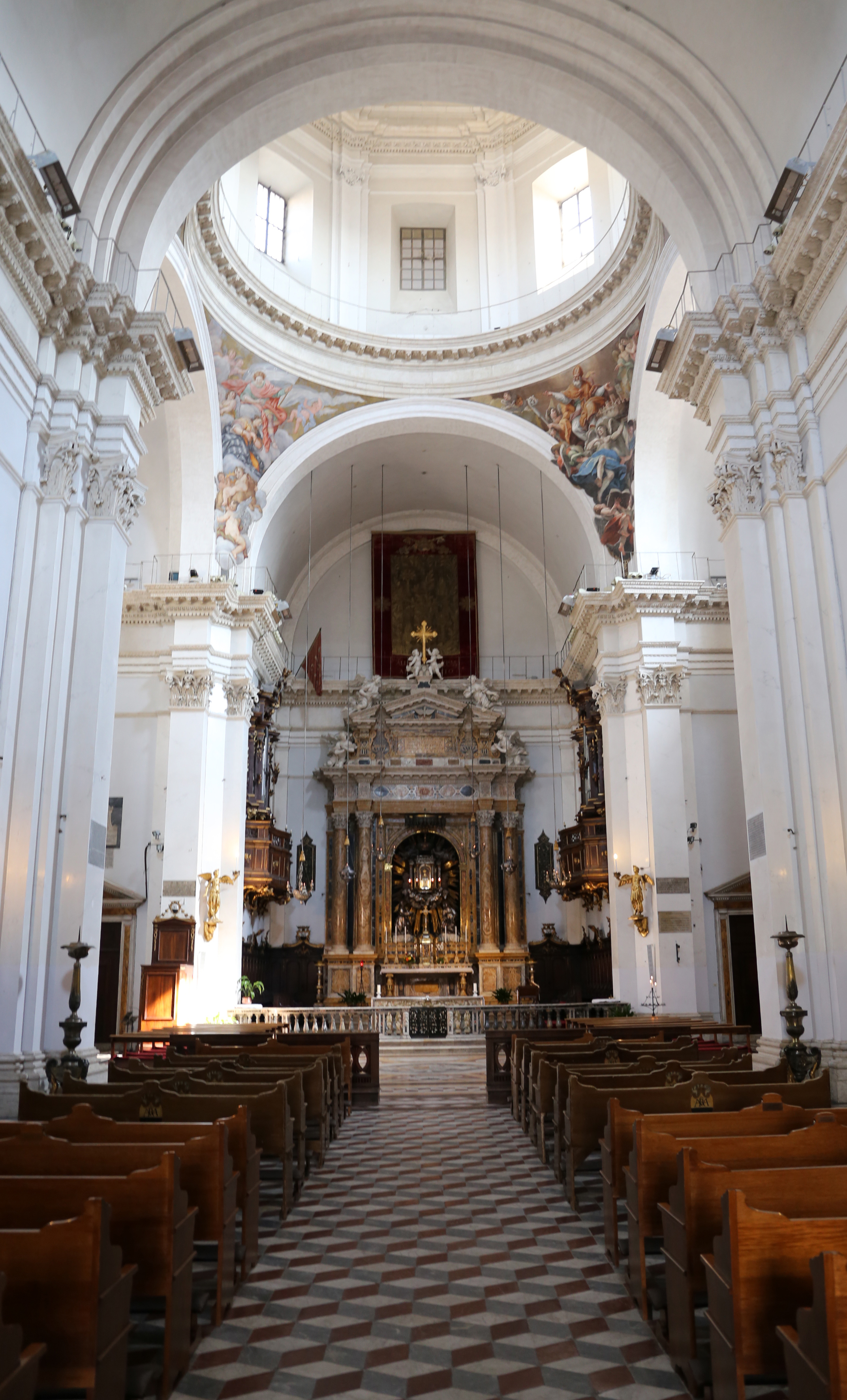
Interior

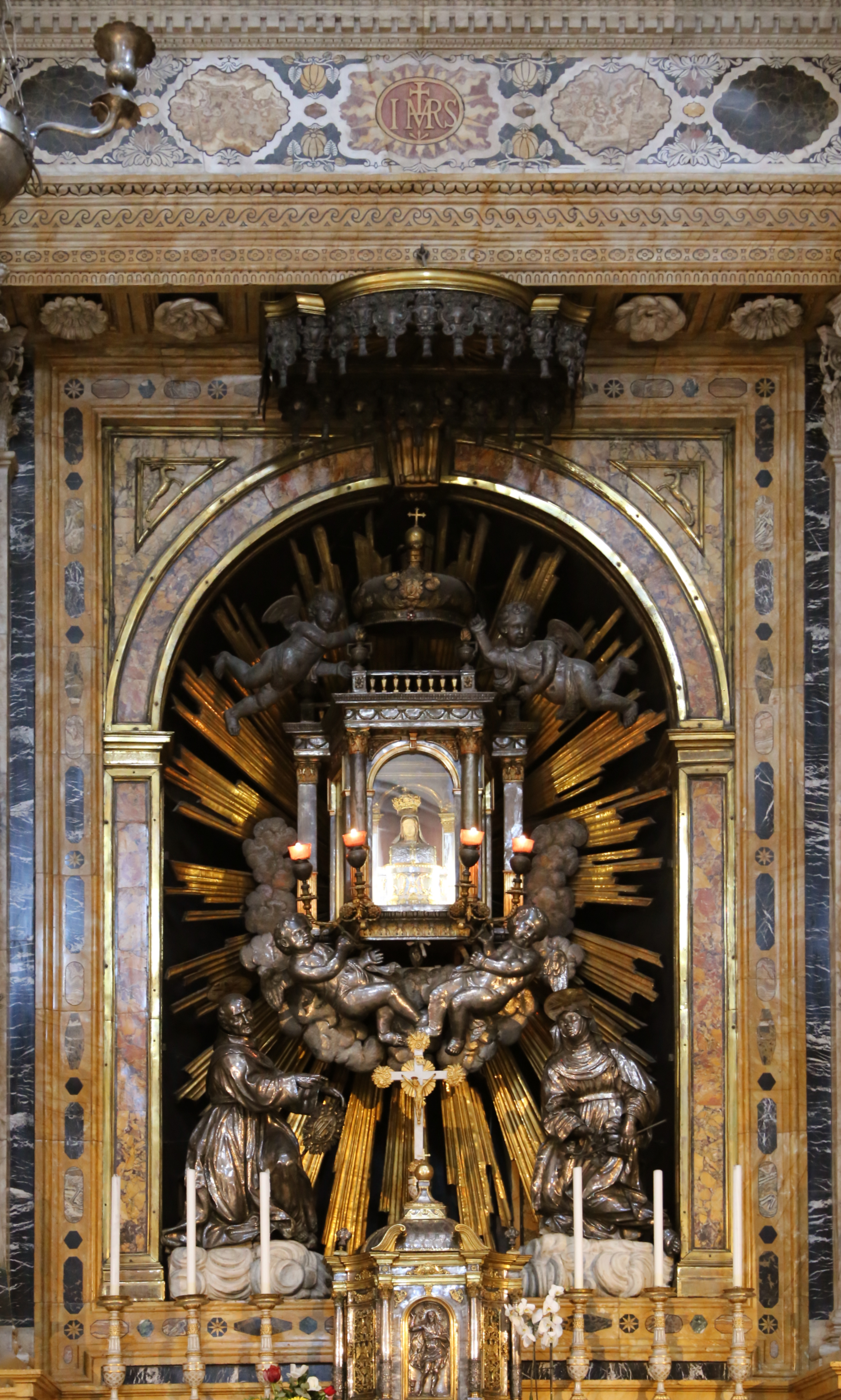
The main altar

Construction of the Mannerist church building, with a Latin Cross layout, was begun in 1595. It has an imposing white marble facade and a peaked dome at the crossing of the transept.

The first altar at the right depicts the Mass of San Cerbone (1630) by Rutilio Manetti. It depicts a miracle that occurred when the holy bishop of Massa Marittima saw apparitions of angels at a service he invoked for the pope. The canvas was commissioned by the bishop of Massa Marittima, Fabio Piccolomini.

The second altar on the right has a canvas depicting Saints Catherine of Siena and Catherine of Alexandria by Francesco Rustici, and one of the Annunciation by Giovanni Domenico Manenti.

The first altar on the left has an altarpiece depicting St Catherine of Siena has a Vision of the Martyrdom of St Lawrence (1685), by Dionisio Montorselli. The canvas was first hanged in the former Sienese church of San Lorenzo, which was destroyed. The second altar on the left has a 19th-century wooden crucifix.

The spandrels of the cupola were frescoed with the four patron Saints of Siena: St Ansano (1715) painted by Giuseppe Nicola Nasini; St Savino and St Crescenzio (1727) by Vincenzo Meucci; and St Vittore (1726) by Gasparo Bidelli. Along the walls are monochrome canvases depicting the Dream of St John the Evangelist and the Mass of St Gregory Magno by Bernardino Mei and Deifebo Burbarini. Along the nave are four large paintings depicting the Nativity of Mary, the Visitation, the Presentation of Jesus at the Temple, and the Coronation of the Virgin by Luigi Boschi and Giovanni Bruni.

In the transept are paintings depicting venerated individuals who had lived in the same neighborhood: St Bernardo Tolomei and the Blessed Savina Petrilli (2013), by Francesco Mori. The polychrome marble floor decoration below the cupola depicts the heraldic symbols of Grandukes of Tuscany Cosimo III de' Medici and Margherita Luisa d'Orléans, and of the Florentine and Sienese states. It is surrounded by the symbols of the nearby bishoprics of the ancient Republic of Siena: Grosseto, Sovana, Pienza, Montalcino, Massa Marittima and Chiusi.

The main altar shelters the terracotta icon of the Madonna di Provenzano in an architectural work (1617-1632) by Flaminio del Turco. The icon is surrounded by a "glory" of silver angels, and bronze statues of Saints Catherine and Bernardino sculpted by Giovanni Battista Querci. Some of the drapery on the altar has the symbols of Pope Alexander VII, the last pope from Siena. In the Sacristy is a Compianto sul Cristo morto by Alessandro Casolani.

The apse displays a flag captured by Sienese mercenary Paolo Amerighi from the Turks during the Battle of Vienna (1683), at the height of the Ottoman invasion of Europe. In the counterfacade is a flag from the Medici Fortress in Siena, given by the Grand-Duke Peter Leopold as a sign of the demilitarization of the city.

Below the church, in its former crypt, is the Oratory del Suffragio, the chapel for the Contrada of Giraffa. It has an entrance on Via della Vergine.
