= Oratory del Suffragio, Siena =

Oratory in Siena, Italy

The Oratory or Church del Suffragio is a small Roman Catholic prayer hall or oratory, located on via delle Vergine in Siena, region of Tuscany, Italy. It was formerly the crypt of the Basilica of Santa Maria di Provenzano, Siena, and is accessed from the side alley near the transept.

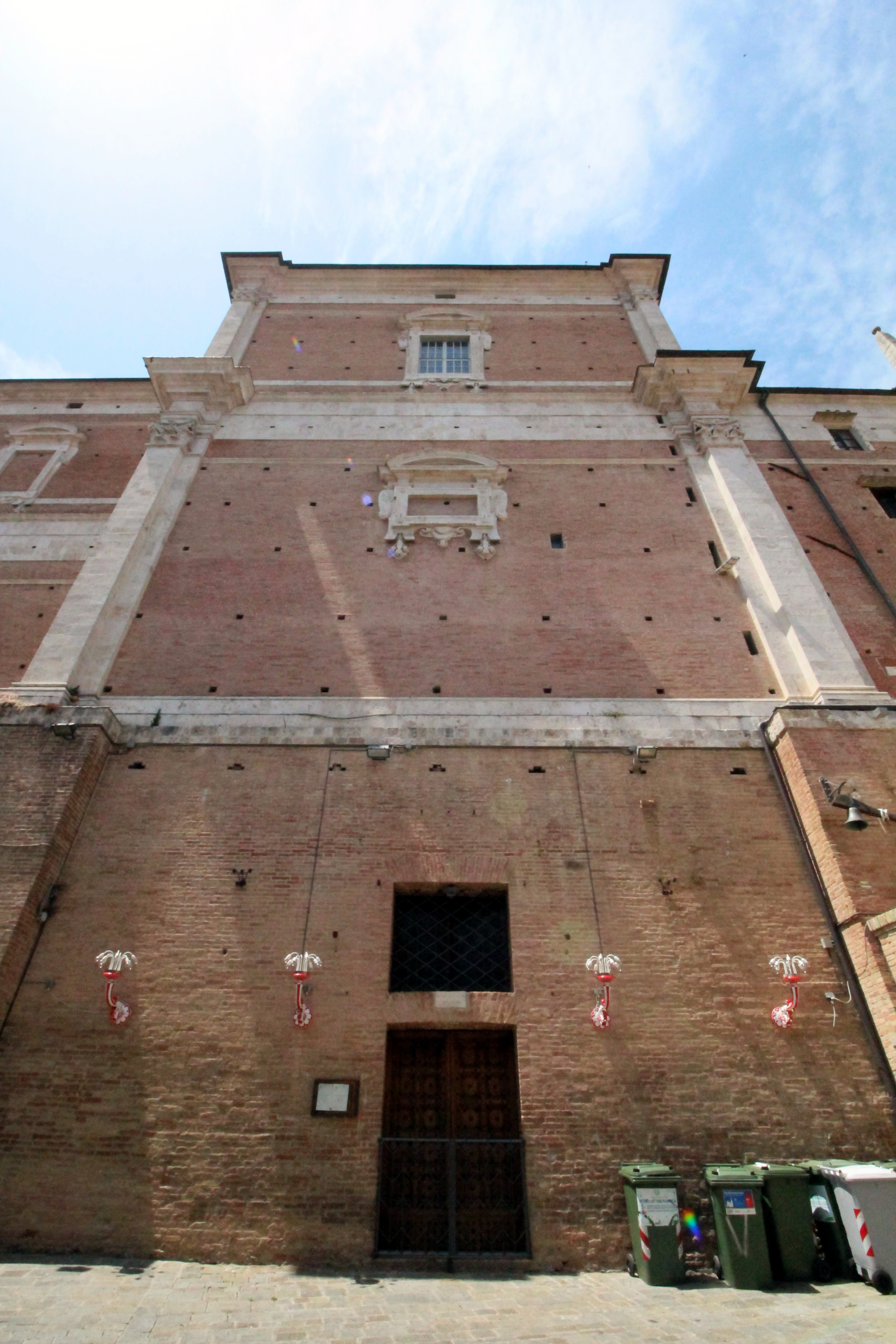
facade and entrance

The simple space has been the property of the Contrada della Giraffa, a ward in north Siena, since 1824. The brick façade leads to a single hall. It houses the venerated icon of the Vergine del Fosso.
