= Master of the Greenville Tondo =

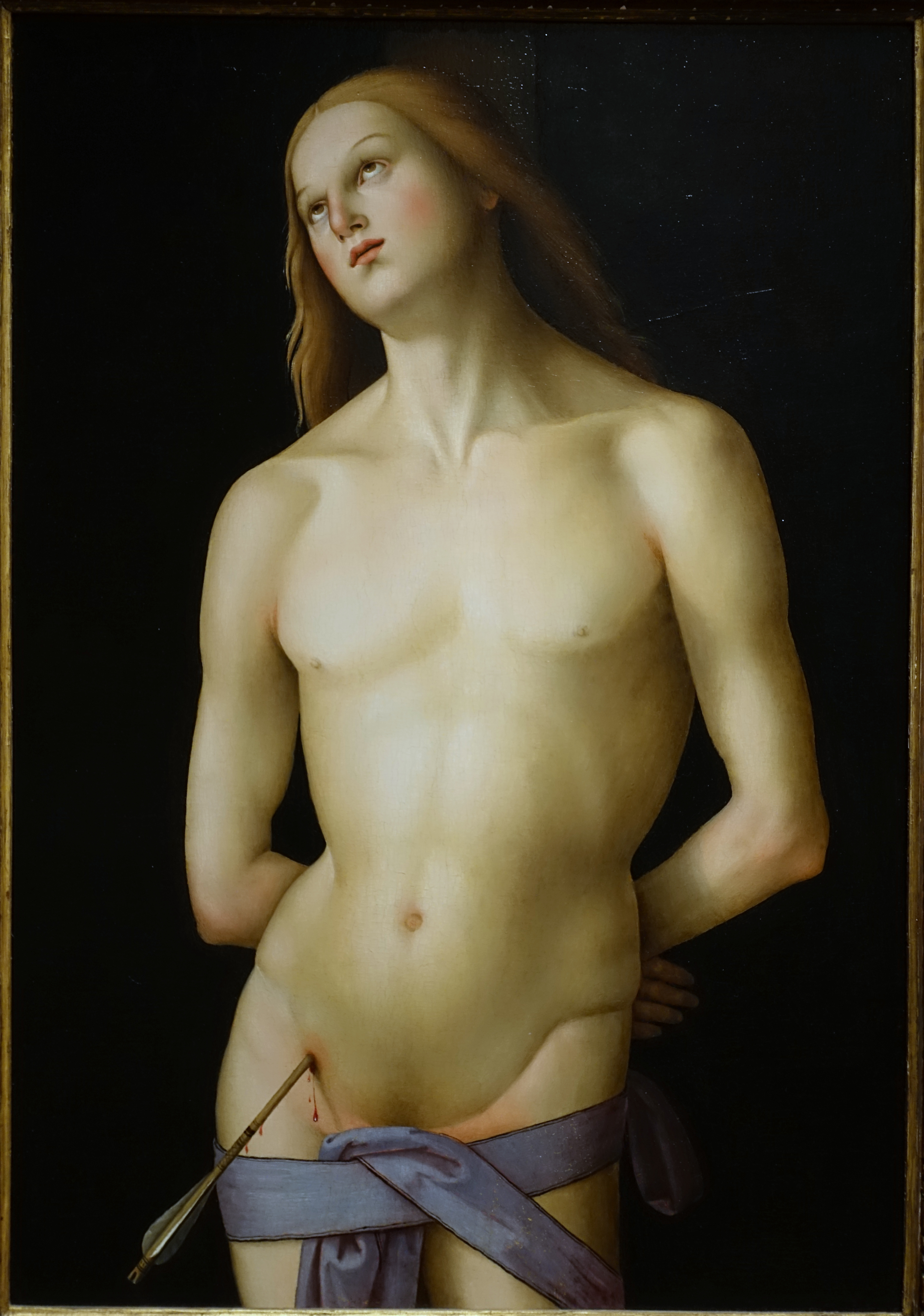
Saint Sebastian by the Master of the Greenville Tondo, c. 1500-1510, in the Princeton University Art Museum

The Master of the Greenville Tondo is the notname for an Italian painter who was active between ca. 1454 and 1513. He is named after a tondo in the Bob Jones University Museum & Gallery in Greenville, South Carolina.

He was probably from Tuscany or Umbria and was a follower of Pietro Perugino, according to art historians Federico Zeri and Everett Fahy. More than twenty works have been attributed to the painter.

== Works ==
- Madonna and Child with Angels, Bob Jones University Museum & Gallery
- Adoration of the Christ Child by Mary and Joseph, Museum of Fine Arts in St. Petersburg, Florida (this work is also known as the Jonas Nativity)
- Madonna and Child with the young Saint John the Baptist and two angels, sold at Sotheby's in 2011 for $30,000
- Altarpiece in the church of Santa Cristina in Pancole, Greve in Chianti
- Madonna and Child with Two Angels, Ca' d'Oro, Venice
- Saint Sebastian, Princeton University Art Museum
- Saint Sebastian, New Jersey State Museum
- Virgin Praying, current location unknown
- Holy Family with Infant St. John the Baptist in a Landscape, Walters Art Museum
