= Palazzo Bandini-Piccolomini =

Coordinates: 43°19′12″N 11°19′58.9″E

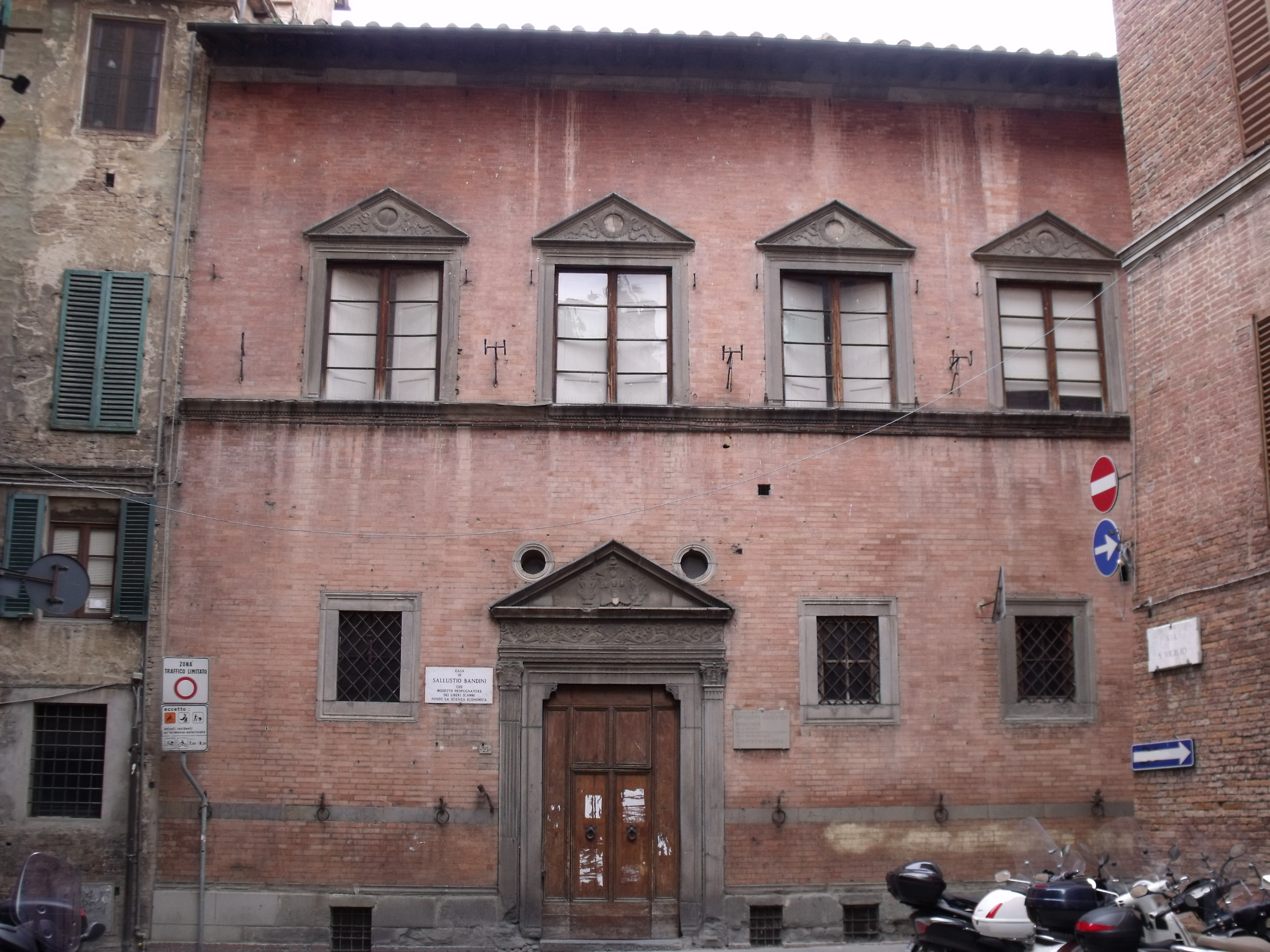
Front view of the palace

The Palazzo Bandini-Piccolomini is a Renaissance style urban palace located on via Sallustio Bandini #32, corner Via San Vigilio in the city of Siena, region of Tuscany. It is across the street from the rear facade of the Castellare degli Ugurghieri. The palace was constructed circa 1460, and the design has been attributed to Cecco di Giorgio. The priest and proto-economist Sallustio Bandini was born in the house. The facade is mainly brick. The portal and window mouldings are made of grey pietra serena and has a Piccolomini shield with 5 crescent moons. The portal also has images of children astride dolphins. The second story windows have triangular pediments. The small interior courtyard has a well. The iron rings on the facade were formerly used to tie up horses. The property is owned by the University of Siena.
