= Santa Lucia, Montepulciano =

Church building in Montepulciano, Italy

Santa Lucia is a Baroque style church, located in the piazza of the same name in the town of Montepulciano, Province of Siena, Region of Tuscany.

The church was designed in 1653 by Flaminio del Turco. The travertine facade sports four composite ionic pilasters with a rounded tympanum above the door. Empty niches and cartouches abound, as well as two stone garlands astride the door. The church underwent restoration in 1822.

The interior has a nave without aisles with a main altar with a wooden crucifix by Giovanni Battista Alessi. The stucco statues of Saints Roch and Sebastian were completed by Bartolomeo Mazzuoli (1684-1749). An altarpiece on the left of the church with Saints Jerome, Margaret, Lawrence, and Agnes was painted by Gaetano Perpignani. To the right of the entrance, in the Ceppari Chapel, is an altarpiece depicting the Madonna della Misericordia by Luca Signorelli. To the left of the church of Santa Lucia is the 13th century Oratory of San Giovanni Battista in Poggiolo.
