= Flaminio del Turco =

Italian architect and sculptor

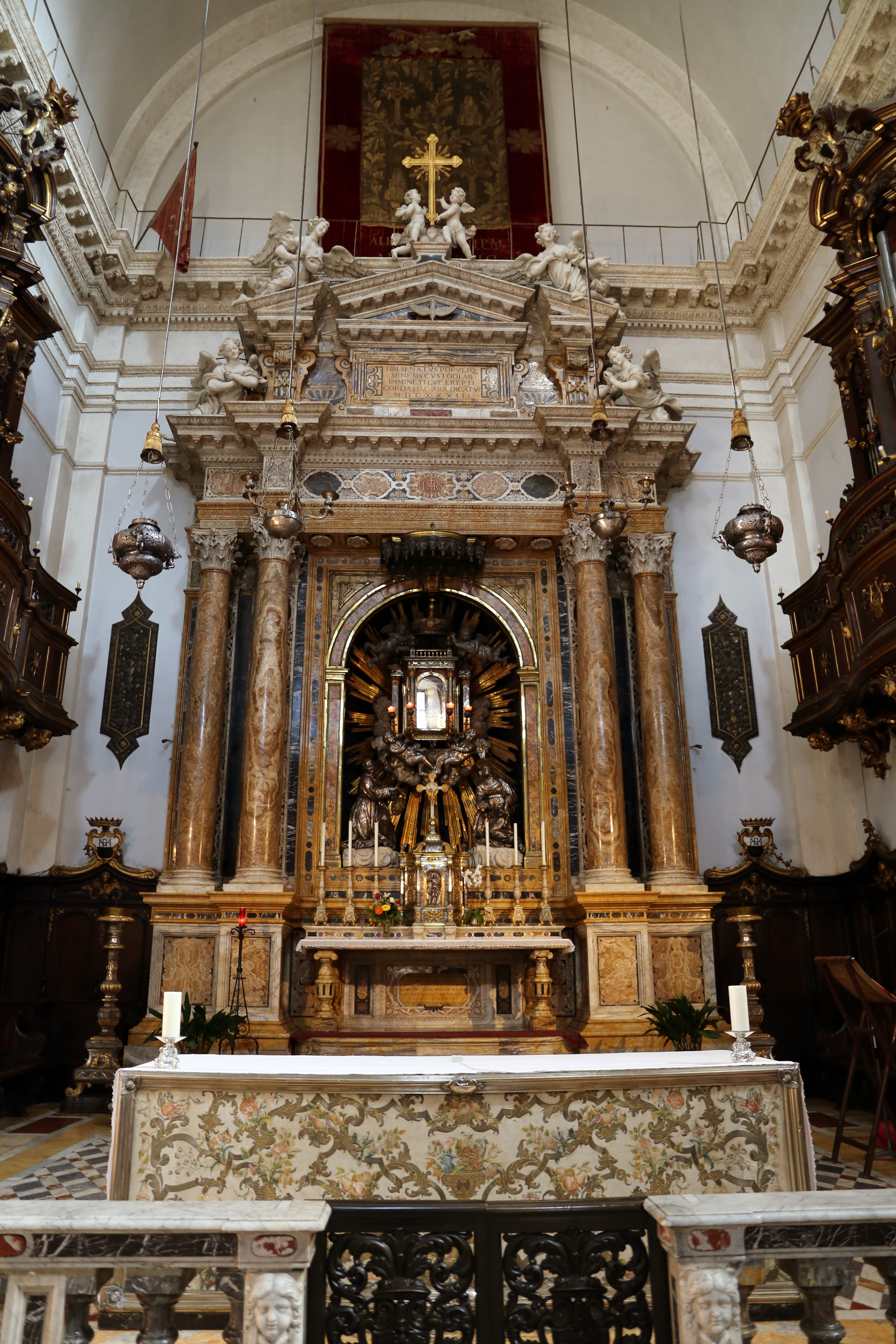
Altare della madonna di provenzano, di flaminio del turco

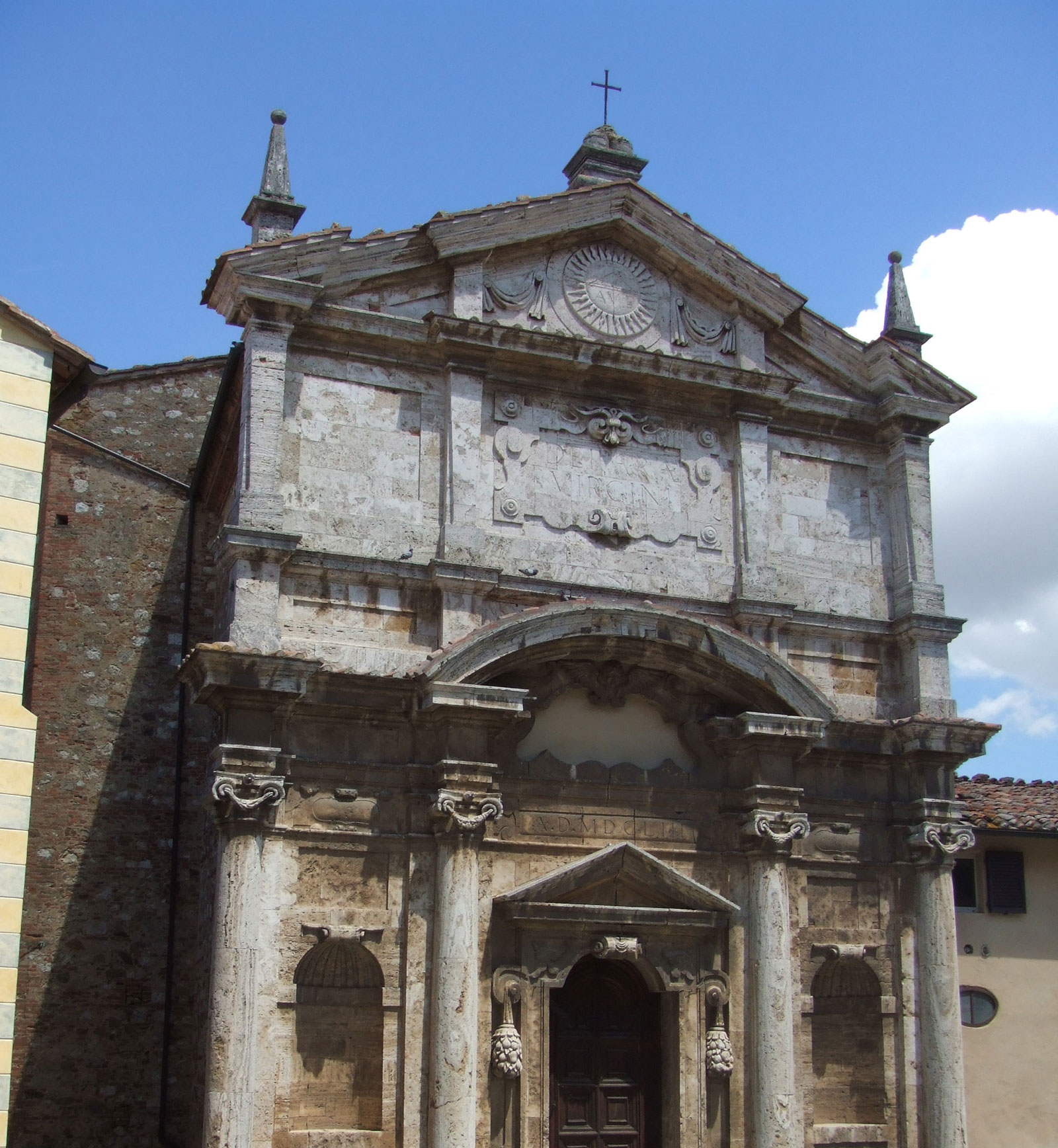
St Lucia Montepulciano by Flaminio del Turco

Flaminio del Turco (active 1581 till death in 1634) was an Italian architect and sculptor. He was born and active mainly in Siena, Italy. Along with Damiano Schifardini, he helped erect the Collegiata di Provenzano. He also helped the design the church of Santa Lucia, Montepulciano. He completed some altars for the Sienese churches of San Raimondo and San Giovannino della Staffa.

According to various texts, due to his skills, he was called upon to make estimates of sculpture works, to arbitrate open questions, as well as to execute sculptures himself, particularly for church altars.

== Biography ==
There are few details about his birth, but the information about his family is quite well known. His father Girolamo was a well-known sculptor in Siena and a certain Bernardino Del Turco, a stonemason, is remembered since the previous century. Flaminio had two sisters, Olimpia and Isabella, both confirmed in 1573, and a brother Alessandro, a goldsmith. We know that Olimpia died in 1585, Alessandro in 1625 and Camilla in 1650, while his parents, Girolamo, died in 1584 and his wife Catarina in 1594.

He was active from 1581 as a sculptor and architect. His fame derives above all from having built the church of Santa Maria di Provenzano, initially entrusted to Don Damiano Schifardini of the Certosa of Florence, but taking into account the distance and the problems that were arising during the planning phase, Del Turco was commissioned. Begun in August 1595, after having verified the construction difficulties relating to the foundations, Del Turco decided to change the location of the church. After the approval of the final project, the works were started and it was consecrated on 16 October 1611 even if it remained an "open building site" for several more years, given that he built the main altar only in 1617 and received the last payment ten years later in 1627. In 1929 and 1930 he built the Piccolomini and Borghesi altars.

Thanks to the notoriety he acquired, construction began in 1614 on the church of Saints Peter and Paul in the Contrada della Chiocciola and the church of Santa Lucia in Montepulciano, built in 1653 but whose design is attributed to Del Turco, who supposedly completed it in 1633.

As a sculptor, many biographers and historians cite numerous altars executed by him, although the reliable sources are scarce. In any case, Enzo Carli in L'Arte a Massa Marittima (1976) speaks of him as the best Sienese architect of his time and one of the most gifted sculptors .

Flaminio Del Turco died in Siena in 1634.
