= Castellare degli Ugurgieri =

Coordinates: 43.319815°N 11.332692°E

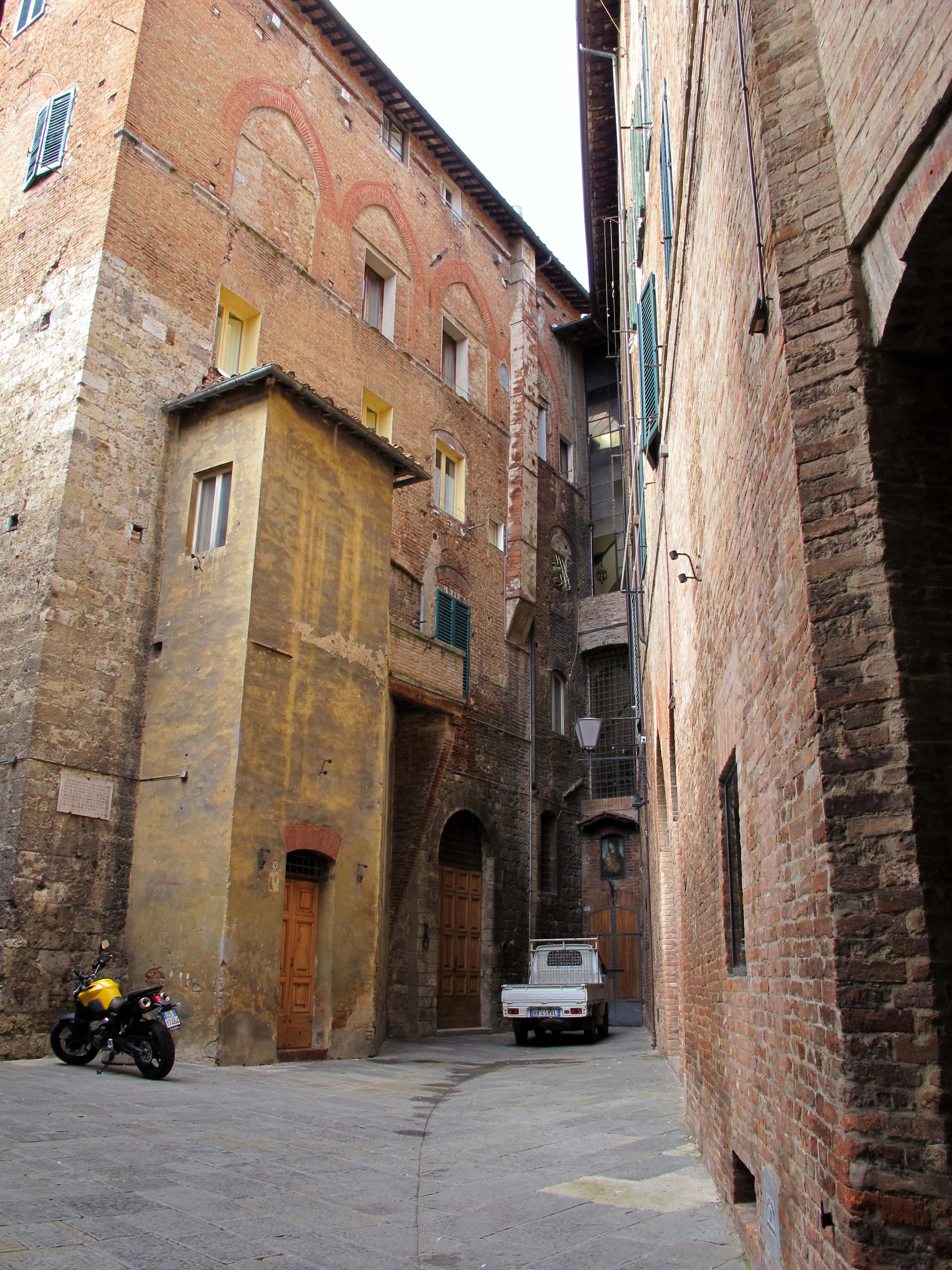
Castellare degli ugurgieri

The Castellare degli Ugurgieri is a medieval fortress-house or fortress-palace, erected by the prominent Sienese Ugurgieri family in the 13th century. It is located on an Via Francigena off Piazza Salimbeni, in central Siena, region of Tuscany, Italy. It is behind the Palazzo Bandini Piccolomini. The courtyard is accessible and the building now houses the headquarters and museum of the Contrada della Civetta.

It is part of the historical center of Siena, which is present in the UNESCO list.
