= Angelo di Niccolò Tegliacci =

Italian painter

Angelo di Niccolò Tegliacci (born 1608) was an Italian painter active in Siena.

He was born in Siena. He painted an altarpiece for San Giovannino della Staffa, Siena. It is unclear if he is distantly related or confused with the 14th-century Sienese painter and illuminator Niccolò di Ser Sozzo, felt to be part of the aristocratic Tegliacci family.
