= Colijn de Coter =

Early Netherlandish painter

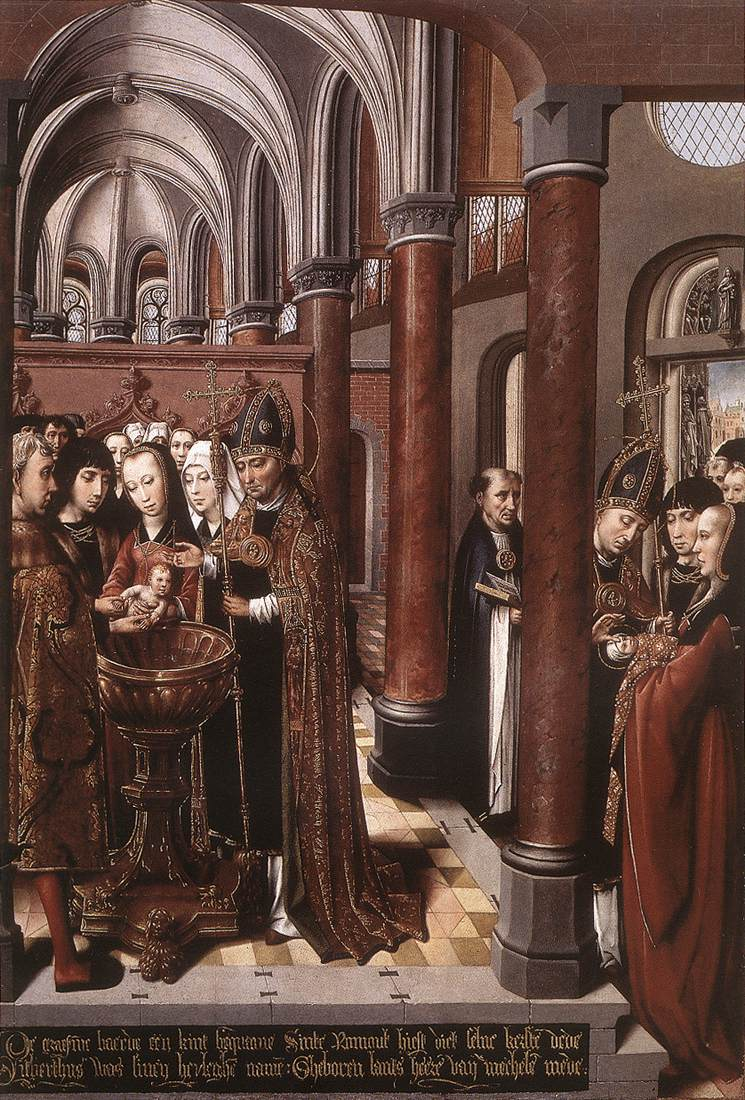
The baptism of Saint Libertus (1490), St. Rumbold's Cathedral, Mechelen

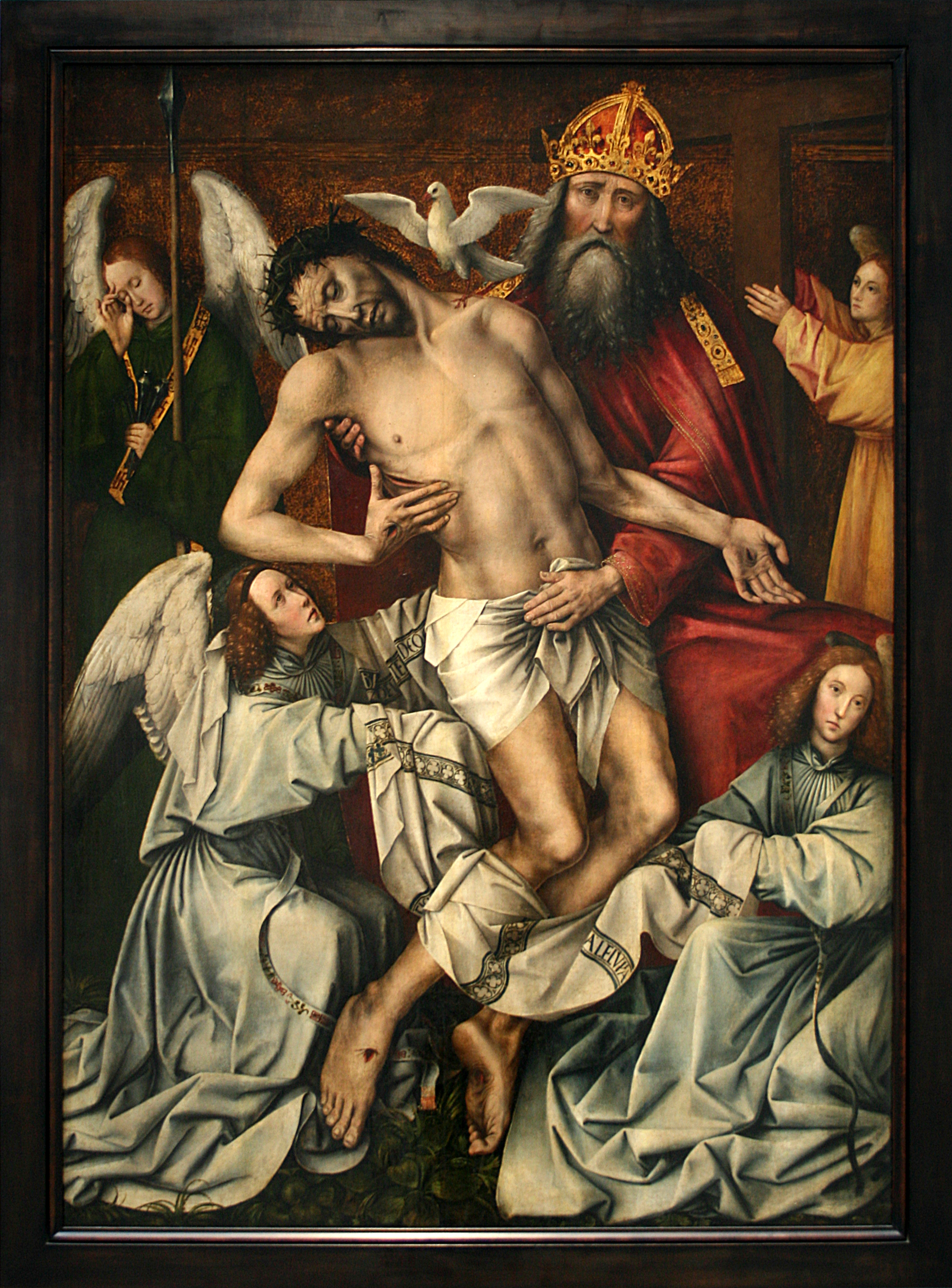
The Holy Trinity, with God the Father supporting Christ (1510-1515), Louvre.

Colijn de Coter (c. 1440–1445 – c. 1522–1532) was an early Netherlandish painter who produced mainly altarpieces. He worked primarily in Brussels and Antwerp. His name was sometimes given as Colijn van Brusele (Colijn of Brussels), indicating that he hailed from Brussels or at least that he lived there most of his active life. He also signed several paintings with Coliin de Coter pinxit me in Brabancia Bruselle ("Colijn de Coter painted me in Brussels in the region of Brabant").

== Biography ==
De Coter was born circa 1440–1445. This can be deduced from a 1479 document in the Brussels archives, naming him as a husband, painter and tenant of a house; in other words, he must have already reached adulthood in that year. Another document, dating from 1483, refers to him as Colijn van Brusele (Colijn of Brussels). This document states that he had registered with the Guild of Saint Luke in Antwerp and decorated a vault in the chapel of that guild in the Cathedral of Our Lady in Antwerp. The archives of the Brussels Brotherhood of Saint Eloy list three payments to Colijn de Coter in 1509–1511 for painting a church tabernacle. From the archives of this brotherhood, we can also deduce that the painter's death probably fell somewhere in the period 1522–1532.

Although unproven, art historians believe Colijn de Coter headed an influential workshop with a number of pupils. This conclusion is based on the diversity in style and quality of the work attributed to him. The Leiden painter Cornelis Engebrechtsz. may have been one of his pupils.

Contracts survive for two lost works by de Coter one dated 1493 for the decoration of a vault of a chapel and the other dated 1509–10 for the commission for the church tabernacle mentioned above. While the dates of these documents mark the known boundaries of his active period, his surviving work shows that this period more likely spanned from the years 1480 to 1525. Three signed paintings are known: St Luke Painting the Virgin in the parish church of Vieure, Cosne d’Allier, the altarpiece of the Trinity (Paris, Louvre) and the Virgin Crowned by Angels (Düsseldorf, private collection). These works are the basis for the attributions of other works to this artist.

Some list Rogier van der Weyden as among Colijn de Coter's influences.

== Works ==
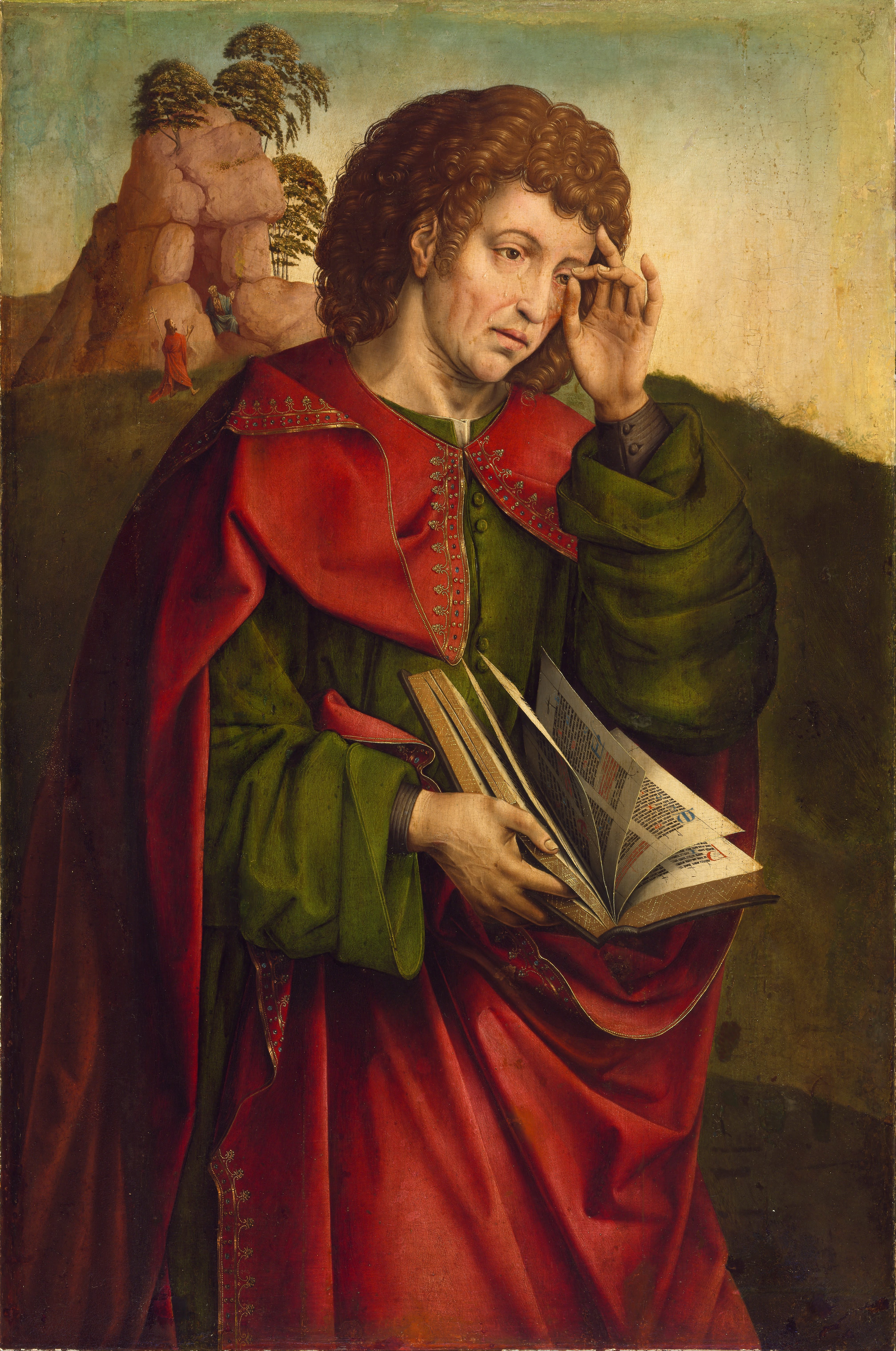
Saint John the Evangelist Weeping

Some paintings attributed to Colijn de Coter are:

- Saint Lucas painting the Holy Virgin (1493) at the Church of St. Louis in Vieure (France). The painting shows both painter and model, while a carpenter is busy building the picture frame. Colijn de Coter is seen at work in his workshop.
- Pruszcz Polyptych (c. 1500), initially in the Parish Church in Pruszcz Gdański and currently in the National Museum in Warsaw, is a set of panels with history of Salvation and Old Testament's prefiguration of Redemption attributed to Colijn de Coter and his workshop.
- Saint Veronica (c. 1510), now at the Wallraf-Richartz-Museum in Cologne, probably the right-side panel of a triptych.
- The lamentation of Christ (c. 1510–1515), Rijksmuseum, Amsterdam.
- The Family of King D. Manuel I of Portugal at the Fons Vitae (1518), in the House of Misericórdia, in Porto.
- Saint Michael the Archangel and Saint Agnes, now at the Bob Jones University Museum & Gallery in Greenville (South Carolina, USA)
- The Holy Virgin with the Four Apostles and Saint Michael (c. 1500–1510), now at the Royal Museums of Fine Arts of Belgium in Brussels, two fragments of an altarpiece of the Last Judgment, possibly commissioned for the main altar of the Church of St. Pantaleon in Cologne.
- The Johanna Van de Maerke Triptych or Descent from the Cross Altarpiece (1522), now at the Royal Museums of Fine Arts of Belgium.
- Descent from the Cross (XV sec.), now in the Museo Regionale di Messina
- The Lamentation (Pietà) (c.1500-1510), now at the Chazen Museum of Art (Madison, USA)
