= Dionisio Montorselli =

Italian painter

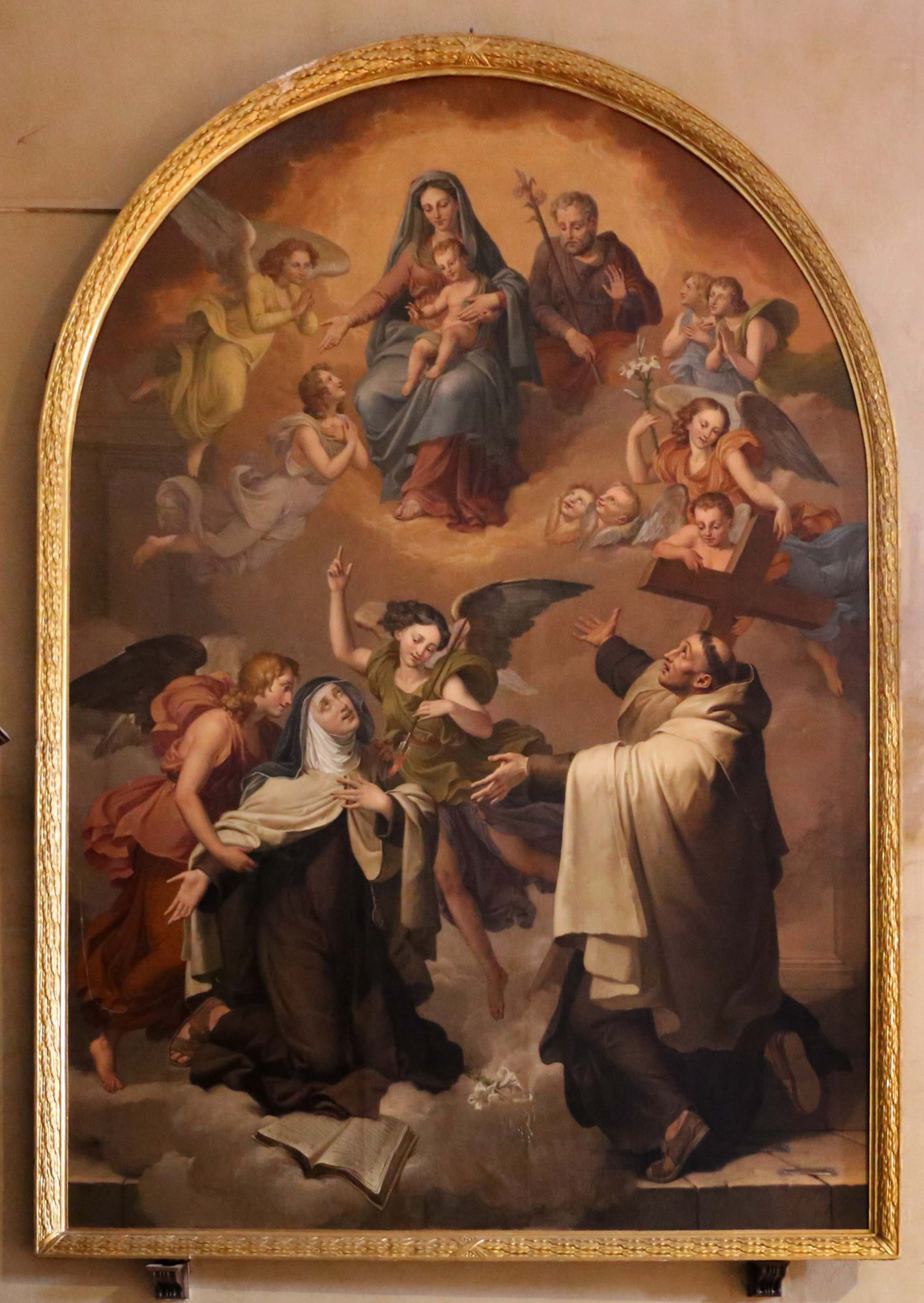
Dionisio Montorselli's altarpiece

Dionisio Montorselli (1653 – circa 1712) was an Italian painter of the late-Baroque period.

== Biography ==
He was born in L'Aquila, but mainly active in Siena painting for churches. In 1685, he traveled to Rome where he became a follower of Pietro da Cortona and Guido Reni. he painted works in the Oratory of San Chiodi (adjacent to the church of San Michele in Poggio); San Vigilio; and Santa Maria in Provenzano.
