= Heritage (Greenville, South Carolina) =

Coordinates: 34.858°N 82.399°W

Heritage is a neighborhood located in Greenville, South Carolina. Located northwest of the city, it is home to the St. George Greek Orthodox Church and was once home to a dairy.

The neighborhood was subdivided in 1909 and experienced peak construction during the 1920s.
