= Raffaello Vanni =

Italian painter

- Hercules and Omphale, Palazzo Martelli, Florence
- Born: 3 September 1595; Siena, Grand Duchy of Tuscany
- Died: 29 November 1673 (aged 78); Siena, Grand Duchy of Tuscany
- Education: Guido Reni; Antonio Carracci
- Known for: Painting
- Movement: Baroque
- Father: Francesco Vanni

Raffaello Vanni, also known as Il Cavaliere (3 September 1595 – 29 November 1673), was an Italian Baroque painter.

== Biography ==
Raffaello Vanni was born in Siena in 1595. He first trained with his father, Francesco Vanni, whose sweetness of style remained a constant influence. After his father’s death in 1610 he went to Rome, where he was apprenticed first to Guido Reni and later to Antonio Carracci. He subsequently he spent a few years in Venice studying colour. His earliest documented work, the Virgin and Child (1644; Siena, Monte Paschi), combines the influence of Siena with the restrained classicism of Antonio Carracci. Later he responded enthusiastically to the Baroque art of Pietro da Cortona and in subsequent years was involved in major projects in Rome, where he worked with the most distinguished artists of the day while still retaining links with Tuscany.

His earliest recorded works include St. Flora and St. Lucilla (1651; Arezzo, Chiesa della Badia), a fresco of the Victory of Clovis over Alaric (1652; Siena, Santa Trinità) and the frescoes featuring scenes from the Life of St. John the Baptist (Siena, San Giovanni Battista della Staffa), in which he collaborated with Rutilio di Lorenzo Manetti. His best Sienese work is the Road to Calvary (1656) in San Giorgio, in which he successfully created a new and personal style from Bolognese classicism and the lyricism of Siena, transformed by the Roman Baroque of Cortona. The St. Ivo in Glory between St. Sebastian and St. Agnes (San Martino, Siena), a more mature work, also reveals a response to Roman Baroque painting. His sweet and tender Holy Family with St John (Florence, Uffizi), however, re-creates the poetic spirit of his father’s painting.

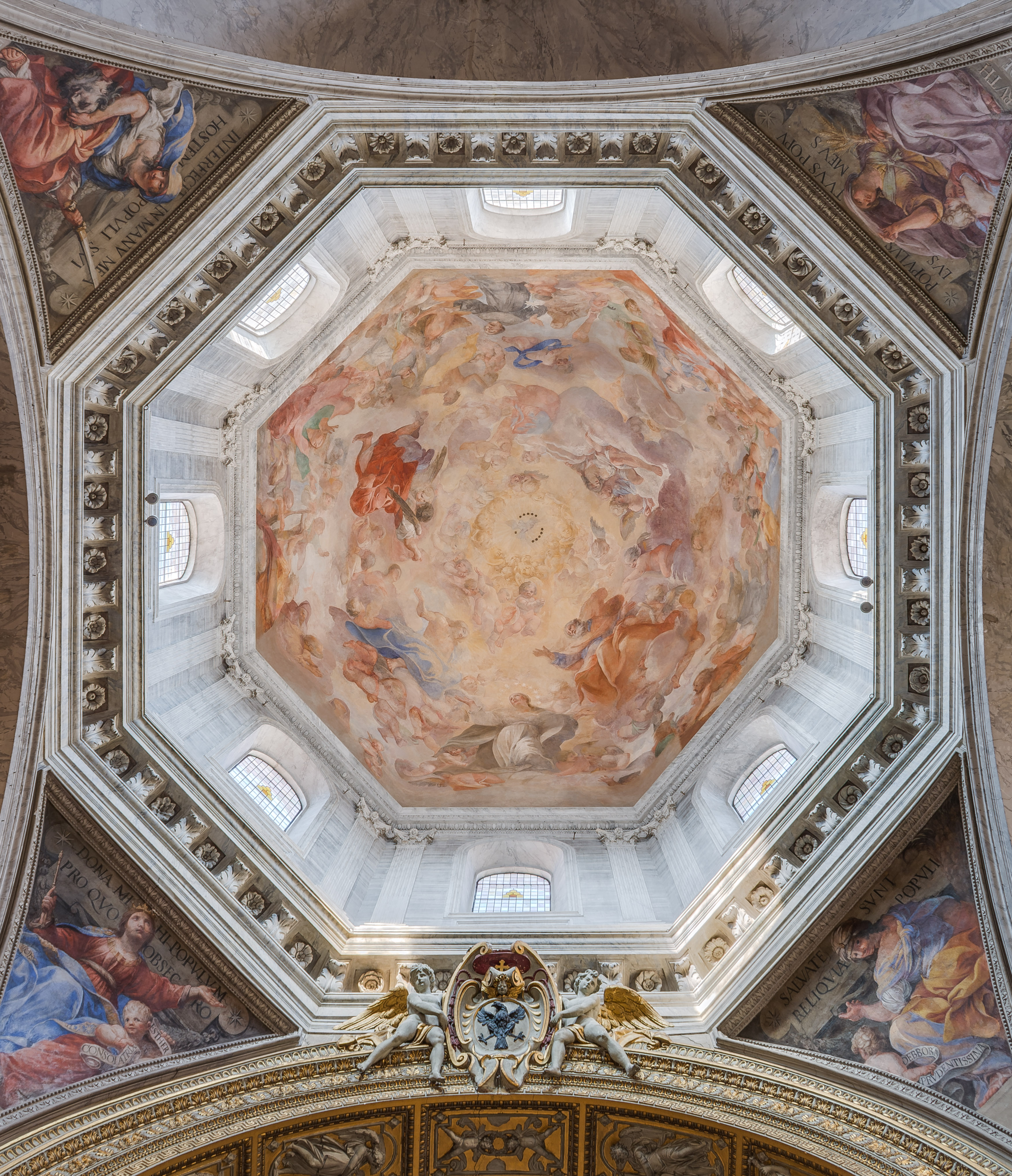
Our Lady in Glory, frescoed by Raffaello Vanni on the saucer dome above the octagonal drum of Santa Maria del Popolo

In Rome, Vanni had succeeded in gaining entry to the Accademia di San Luca and was Principal from 1658 to 1660. Among his Roman works are two canvases in Santa Maria in Publicolis: the Birth of the Virgin on the high altar and St. Helen before the Cross on a side-wall (both 1643; in situ). In 1653 he also painted two lunettes for Santa Maria del Popolo representing The royal ancestors of the Virgin and The sacerdotal ancestors of the Virgin. In 1656–7 he was commissioned to paint the Birth of the Virgin for the decoration of the walls of the octagon in Santa Maria della Pace, Rome (in situ), where Pietro da Cortona was directing the restoration. Vanni’s work, magnificent and grandly composed, is dominated by the influence of Cortona (who may have won him the commission), although there remain echoes of Bolognese classicism. Between June 1656 and 1658, he painted the dome fresco Our Lady in Glory and the pendentives in Santa Maria del Popolo, under the supervision of Bernini.

In 1665 Vanni was one of a group of artists selected by Gian Lorenzo Bernini to paint altarpieces for the Collegiata of Santa Maria Assunta, Ariccia, a building that Bernini had designed. Vanni’s Death of St. Thomas of Villanueva is a grave and clearly structured work that reflects his training with Antonio Carracci. In the last decades of his life he painted for private collectors and for churches in Tuscany, especially in Siena. His Dream of St. Robert’s Mother (Rome, Santa Croce in Gerusalemme) is a late work from the 1670s, arranged on two levels, and including the miraculous appearance of the Virgin. It is Vanni’s parting tribute to Roman Baroque painting, particularly to Pietro da Cortona, whose example so dominated his mature oeuvre.Vanni died in Siena on 29 November 1673, aged 78. His brother, Michelangelo Vanni, is better known as the inventor of a process of making pictures by staining marble than as an artist. The most important of his pupils was Deifebo Burbarini.

== Gallery ==
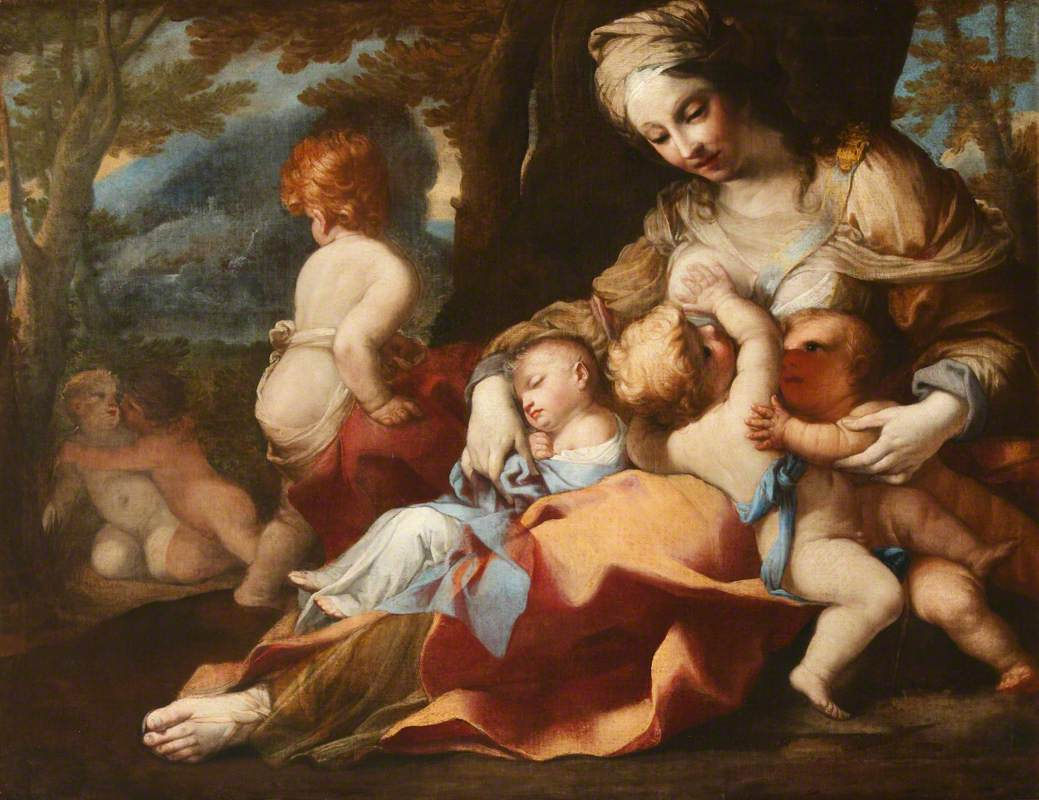
Allegory of Charity, National Trust

Allegory of Faith, National Trust

Charity, Monte dei Paschi Art Collection, Siena

St. Cosmas, Museo dell'Opera del Duomo, Siena

== Bibliography ==
- Bryan, Michael (1889). Walter Armstrong; Robert Edmund Graves (eds.). Dictionary of Painters and Engravers, Biographical and Critical. Vol. II L-Z. London: George Bell and Sons. p. 633.
- Pedrocchi, Anna Maria (2009). "Raffaello Vanni in Santa Maria del Popolo". In Ilaria Miarelli; Maria Richiello (eds.). Santa Maria del Popolo. Storia e Restauri. Vol. II. Rome: Istituto Poligrafico dello Stato. pp. 621–637. ISBN 978-8824010054.
- Bruno, Silvia (2020). "VANNI, Raffaello". Dizionario Biografico degli Italiani (in Italian). Vol. 98: Valeriani–Verra. Rome: Institute of the Italian Encyclopaedia. ISBN 978-88-12-00032-6.
