= Pier Francesco Sacchi =

Italian painter

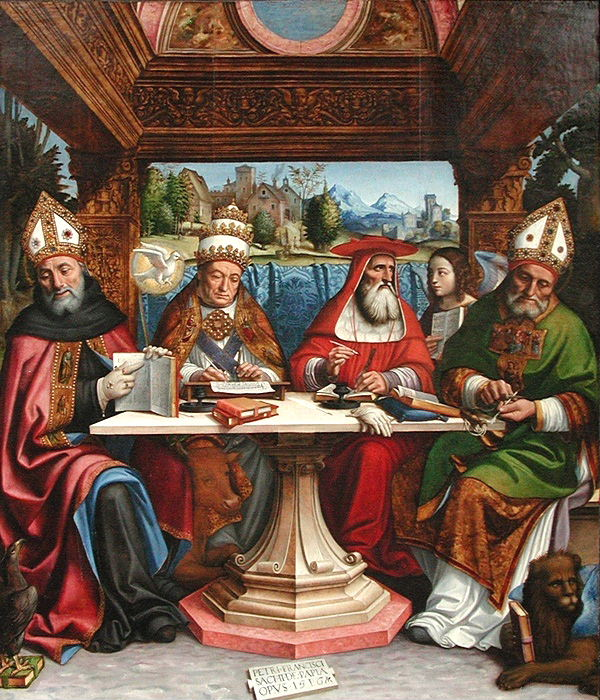
Pier Francesco Sacchi, Four doctors of the Church represented with attributes of the Four Evangelists. ca. 1516. 196 cm x 168 cm

Pier-Francesco Sacchi (known active 1512–1520) was an Italian painter of the Renaissance period.

Born in Pavia, he worked in Genoa and became a member of that guild of painters in 1520. He painted in 1512 the Parting of St. John the Baptist from his parents for the Oratory of Santa Maria in Genoa. He followed the style of Carlo Mantegna.
