= Francesco di Vannuccio =

Italian painter

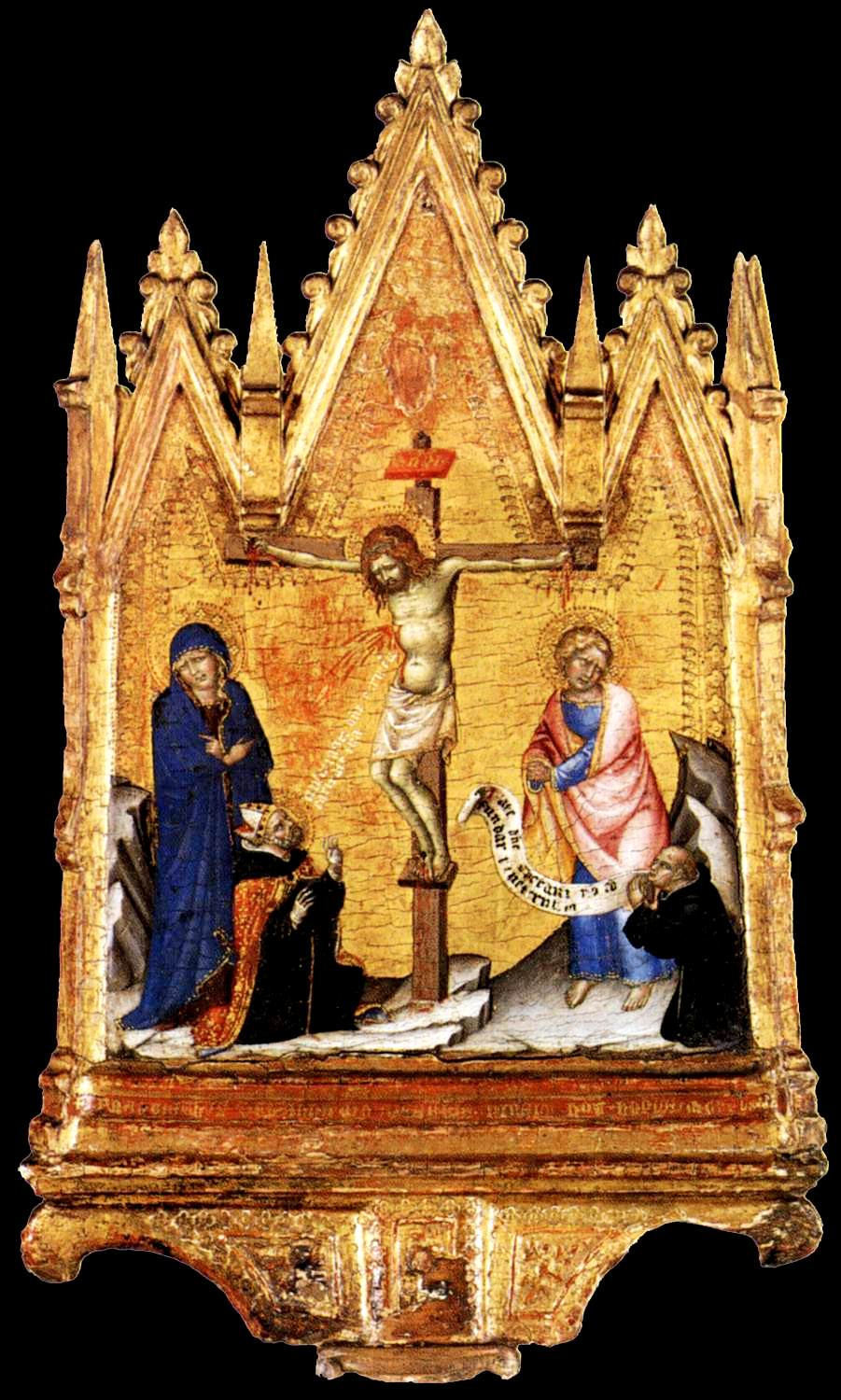
Crucifixion with Donor by Francesco di Vannuccio, 1380, Gemäldegalerie, Berlin

Francesco di Vannuccio (documented 1356–1389; died before 1391) was an Italian painter born in Siena. A small body of work has been ascribed to this painter, characterized by an attention to and love of pattern and decoration, a tradition dating back in Siena to Simone Martini. A signed and dated double-sided processional standard of 1380, painted on one side with the Crucifixion and on the other side with a painted glass depiction of the Virgin Enthroned with Saints, in the Gemäldegalerie, Berlin (inv. no. 1062B), has been the basis on which a number of other paintings have been attributed. Most of these are small-scale works, richly finished, which were meant for private devotion, suggesting that Francesco di Vannuccio worked for a discerning and wealthy group of private patrons.
