= Deifebo Burbarini =

Italian painter

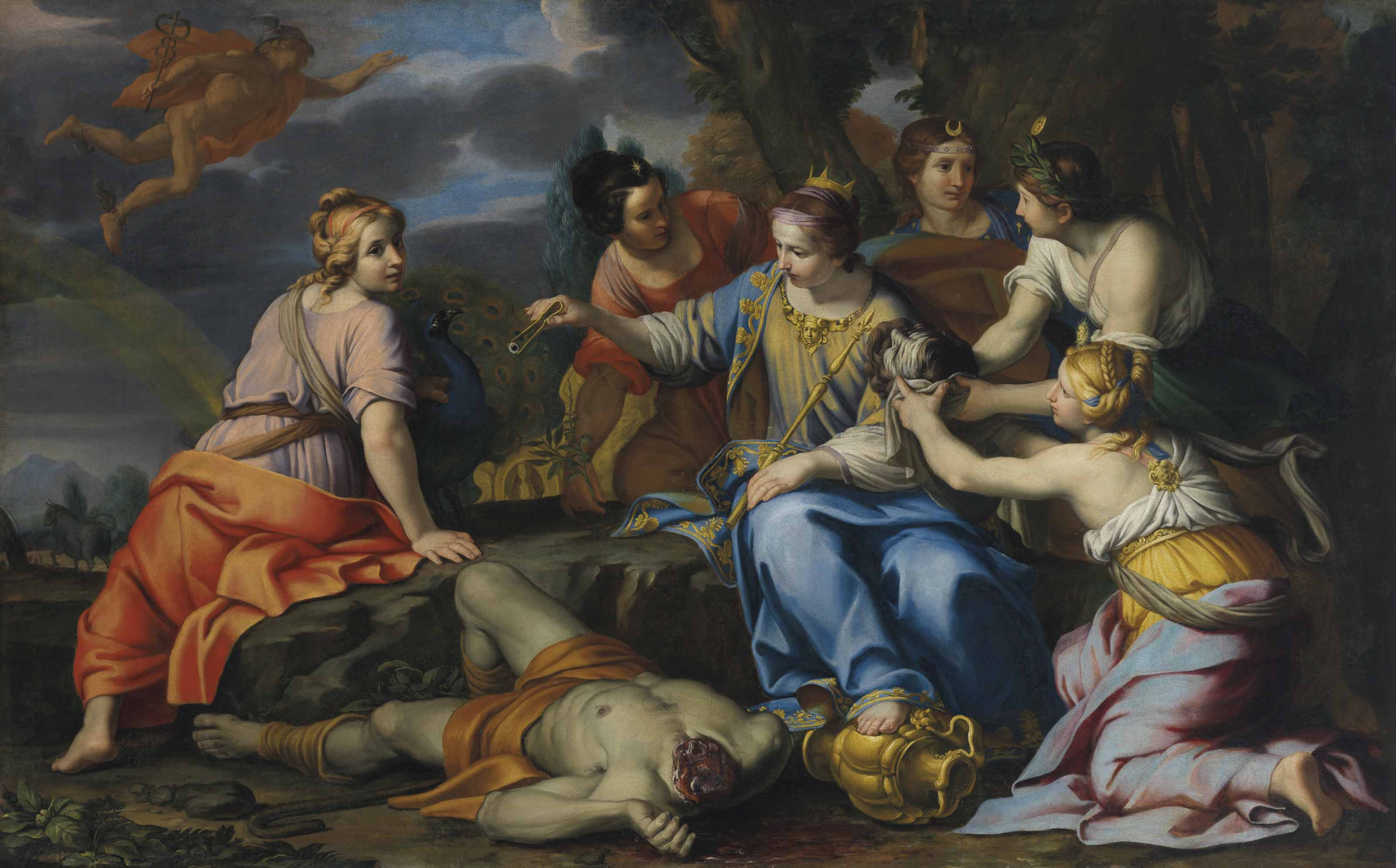
- Juno placing the eyes of Argus on the tail of a peacock, c. 1650-1659, priv. col.
- Born: 1619; Siena, Grand Duchy of Tuscany
- Died: 16 April 1782 (aged 71); Siena, Grand Duchy of Tuscany
- Education: Raffaello Vanni
- Occupation: 4 March 1680
- Known for: Painting
- Movement: Baroque

Deifebo Burbarini (1619 in Siena – 4 March 1680) was an Italian painter of the Baroque period.

== Biography ==
Born in Siena in 1619, Burbarini was a pupil of Raffaello Vanni. Like his master, he favoured garish colours and exuberant compositions, which were particularly suited to large church decorations. Burbarini was active in the Province of Siena and Rome, painting mainly religious altarpieces. His earliest independent works, dating to the 1640s, reveal a style similar to that of Rutilio di Lorenzo Manetti. Burbarini is not documented in Siena between 1650 and 1664 and probably spent this period in Rome. One of his best-known works is the Apparition of St. Catherine to St. Rose of Lima, in the Cappella delle Volte in the Basilica of San Domenico, Siena. Burbarini died in Siena on 4 March 1680, aged 71, and was buried in Oratorio dei Santi Ludovico e Gherardo, near the Basilica of San Francesco in the Contrada del Bruco.

== Bibliography ==
- (in German) Burbarini, Deifebo. In: Allgemeines Künstlerlexikon. Die Bildenden Künstler aller Zeiten und Völker (AKL). Band 15, Saur, München u. a. 1996, ISBN 3-598-22755-8, S. 176 f.
