= San Giacinto, Siena =

Renaissance-style former-Roman Catholic church in Siena, Italy

Coordinates: 43°19′03.0″N 11°20′28.5″E

San Giacinto is a Renaissance-style, former-Roman Catholic church, now deconsecrated, located at via dei Pispini 162a, in the city of Siena, region of Tuscany, Italy. It is located about 8 doors down from Porta dei Pìspini on the south side of the street.

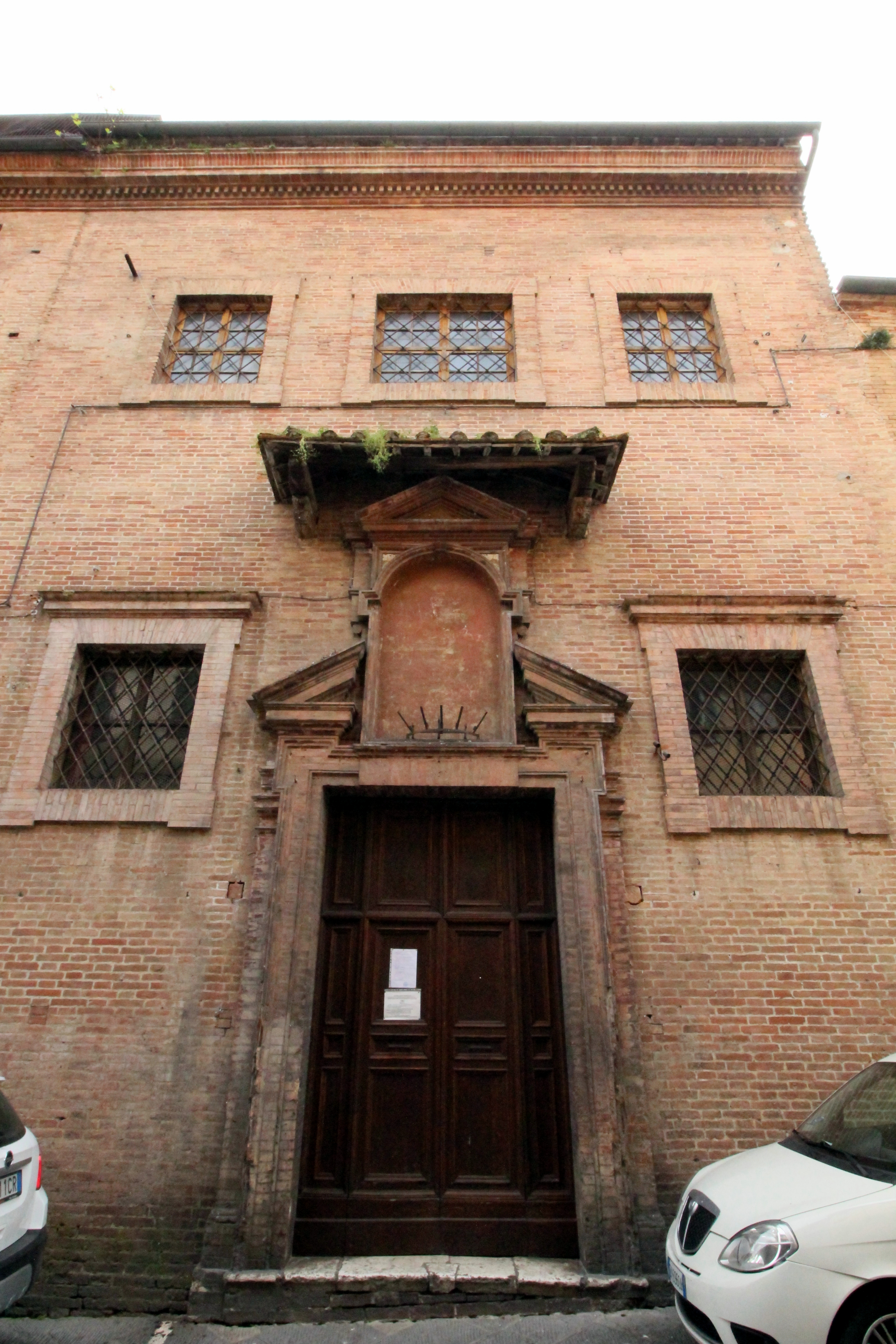
San Giacinto portal

== History ==
The church was associated with a monastery of Dominican nuns, called of the Vita Eterna, which ran an adjacent orphanage. Since 1528, it became the oratory of the Confraternity of Sant'Emidio, which still persists as a lay confraternity. The church is now used by the Musica Siena for concerts.

The church has a simple brick facade with pilasters. Above the door is a faded fresco by Francesco Rustici (il Rustichino), who also painted for the interior.

The main altarpiece is a Miracle of St. Giacinto granting vision to a blind child (1615) by il Rustichino. On the right of the church, an additional altarpiece depicts the Mystical Marriage of Saint Catherine of Siena by Cristofano and Vincenzo Rustici, respectively the uncle and father of Francesco. On the left of the church, is a Madonna del Rosario attributed to Niccolo Nasini, but which others state is a seventeenth-century copy of a lost original by Fra’ Paolino da Pistoia or Bartolomeo della Porta.

Above the door to the monastery, there is a fresco of a Madonna attributed to il Brescianino. In the 19th century, the monastery had been a widow's home, founded by Maria Assunta Butini-Bourke.
