= Rustici =

Rustici is an Italian surname. Notable people with the surname include:

- Cristoforo Rustici, known as il Rusticone, (1552 – 1641), Italian painter
- Francesco Rustici, known as Il Rustichino (c.1592 - 1625), baroque painter of the Sienese School
- Giovanni Francesco Rustici (1474-1554), Italian sculptor
- Marco di Bartolomeo Rustici (c.1393 - 1457), Florentine goldsmith
- Vincenzo Rustici (1556–1632) Italian painter

== See also ==
- Rustici Codex or Codice Rustici, a miniature codex (1448-1450) saved in the library of the Grand Seminary of Florence
- Rustici Engine (SCORM)
