= San Pietro alle Scale, Siena =

Roman Catholic parish church in Tuscany, Italy

Coordinates: 43.315464°N 11.330873°E

Chiesa di San Pietro alle Scale
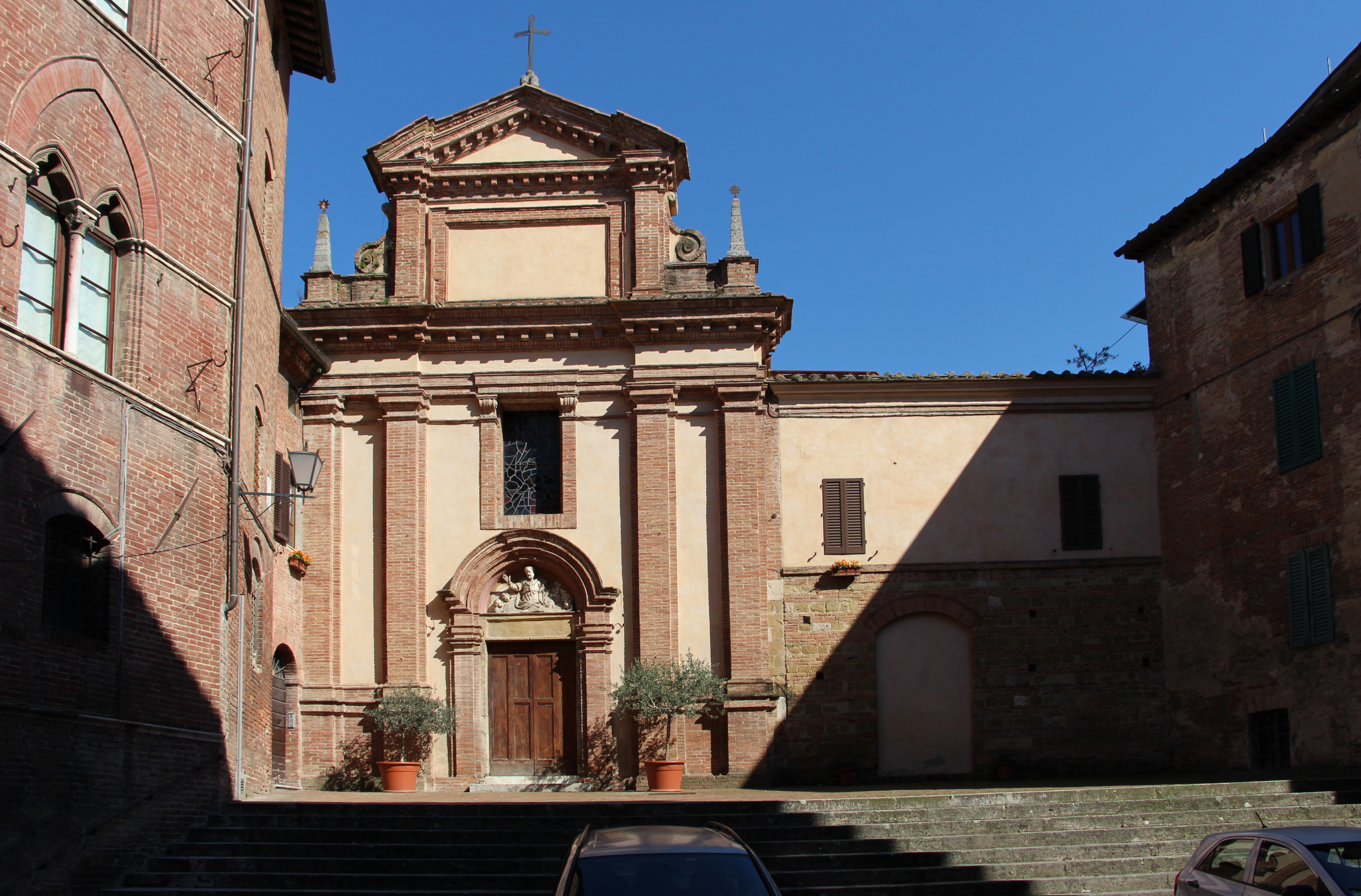

Location
- Interactive map of Chiesa di San Pietro alle Scale

Architecture
- Groundbreaking: 13th century
- Completed: 18th century

San Pietro alle Scale, also known as San Pietro in Castelvecchio, is a Roman Catholic parish church located on via San Pietro, Terzo of Città, in Siena, region of Tuscany, Italy. Initially built in the 12th century, this parish church was completely rebuilt in a Baroque style in the 17th century; the brick facade has a portal with a depiction of Glory of St Peter. The belltower dates to 1699, and the facade to 1706.

Amid the interior’s elaborate stucco decoration, are the remains of a 14th-century polyptych by Ambrogio Lorenzetti, depicting a Madonna with Child and Saints; St Lucia and the Archangel Gabriel; The Redeemer blessing; Sts Peter and Paul; and a Female Saint and St Michael Archangel. The church also contains a Rest on the Flight to Egypt (1621) by Rutilio Manetti. An altar on the right has a canvas depicting Madonna in Glory by Francesco Rustici, and a canvas of St Roch and St Catherine of Siena by Ventura Salimbeni.

This is one of two churches in Siena dedicated to St Peter, the other is the church of San Pietro alla Magione.
