= San Francesco, Pienza =

Roman Catholic church in Pienza, Tuscany, Italy

Coordinates: 43.0767°N 11.6785°E

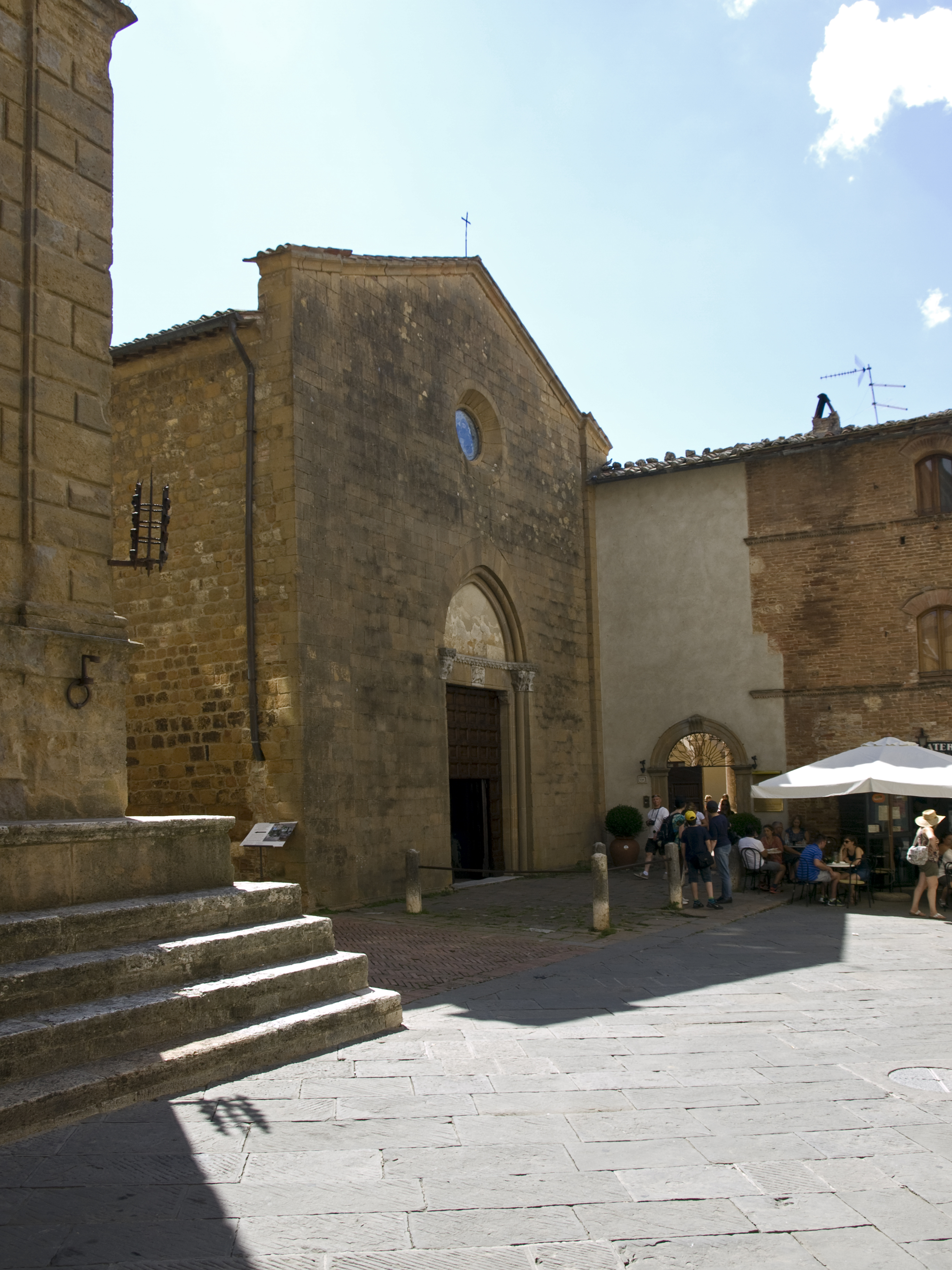
The main entrance

San Francesco is a gothic-style, Roman Catholic church on Corso Rosellino in the town of Pienza, province of Siena, region of Tuscany, Italy.

The church was founded in the 13th century by Franciscans from the monastery of Corsignano. The exterior is rustic and incomplete, but the interior once was densely populated by 14th-century frescoes. A few still remain. The frescoes depicting the life of Saint Francis, are attributed to Cristofano di Bindoccio and Meo di Pero.

At present it also contains: an altarpiece of the school of Duccio Boninsegna; a Madonna attributed to Luca Signorelli; and paintings by Matteo Balducci and Ugolino Lorenzetti.
