= San Pietro alla Magione, Siena =

Ancient church in Siena, Italy

Coordinates: 43.326614°N 11.325991°E

Church of San Pietro alla Magione
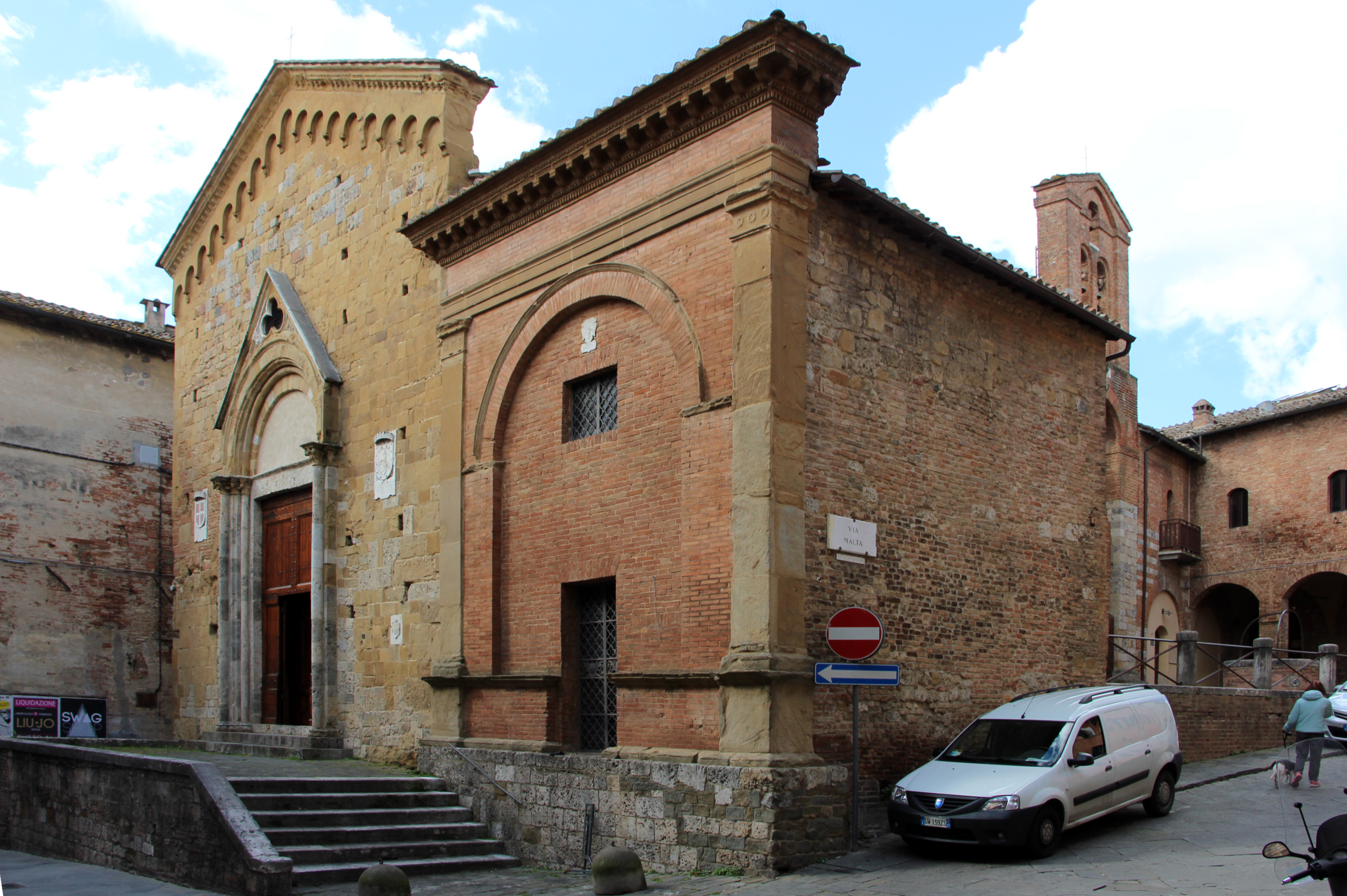

Religion
- Affiliation: Roman Catholic
- Province: Siena, Italy

Location
- Interactive map of Church of San Pietro alla Magione

Architecture
- Style: Romanesque
- Completed: 10th century

San Pietro alla Magione is an ancient church on Via Camollia in Siena, Italy.

Documents attest to a church at the site since 998, when Counts Bernardo and Gualfredo Ranieri, along with their cousin Guilla, donated property to the church.

In the 12th century, the Knights Templar set up a hospice at a house ('Magione') beside the church.

In 1312, the church passed to the Order of the Hospitallers (later the Order of Malta).

The church is built in stone, and preceded by a stairs and a Romanesque bell portal. The austere interior was restored in 1957 and contains a Gothic tabernacle from the second half of the 14th century, a Madonna with Saints John the Baptist and Peter by Diego Pesco, fragments of frescoes (Cruxifixion and Biblical Stories) by Cristoforo di Bindoccio and Meo di Pero. The chapel on the right was erected in 1523-26 as an ex voto for the passing of the plague; it houses a Martyrdom of St Donnino by Antonio Nasini, a fragment of a Madonna with Child attributed to Lorenzo Rustici.

== Sources ==
- Rete Toscana Luoghi della Fede, entry on church.
