= Porta dei Pìspini, Siena =

Coordinates: 43.317322°N 11.342551°E

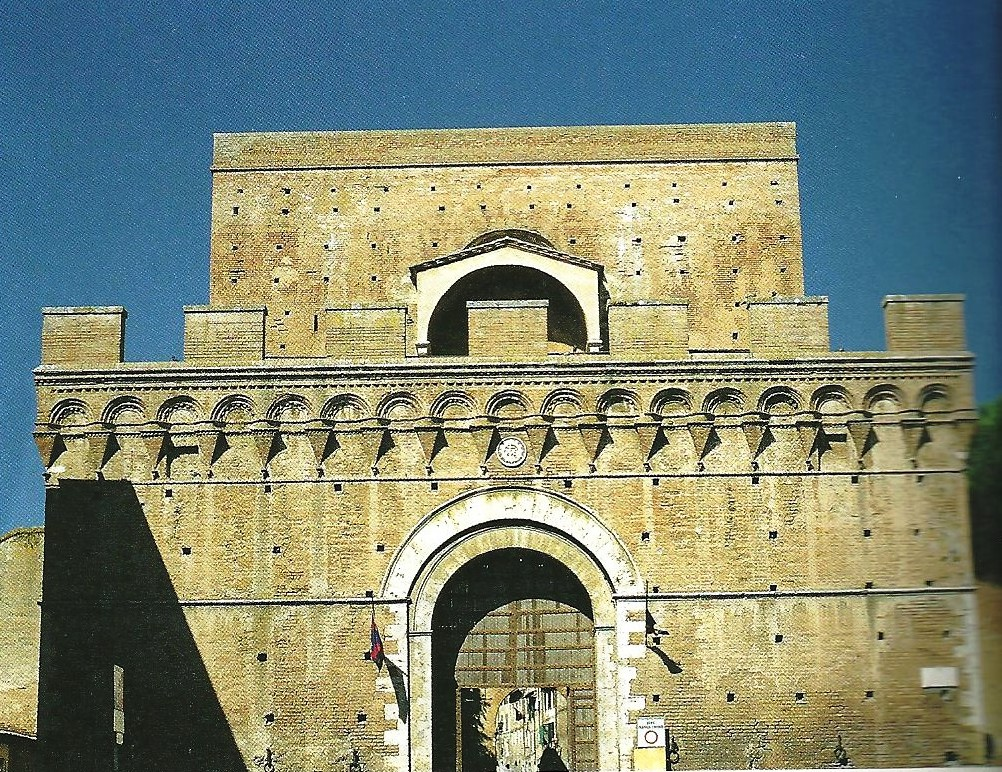
Porta dei Pispini

The Porta dei Pìspini or Gate of the Water-spout is one of the portals in the medieval walls of Siena, region of Tuscany, Italy. It is located on the east side of town, in the contrada del Nicchio in the terzo of San Martino, where Via Pìspini meets Via Aretina. The gate took its name from a nearby fountain; the nearby Fonte de' Pispina, however, was built in 1534–1538.

== History ==
Originally it was called Porta San Viene, because through this gate the relics of Sant'Ansano came (vennero) into the city. However construction of present gate was not begun until the 1250s, and the walls connecting to the nearby gates were not completed till the 15th century.

Like its generally contemporary Porta Romana, the gate has a double set of portals. Each gate has a crenellated roofline. The gate was erected in 1326 to a design by Minuccio di Rinaldo (Moccio).

A small bastion stands beside the gate, added by Baldassarre Peruzzi, between 1527 and 1532.

The interior facade once had a large fresco of the Nativity (1530–1531) painted by Sodoma; the deteriorated remains of the fresco are now kept in the Basilica di San Francesco.

== Bibliography ==
- Toscana. Guida d'Italia (Guida rossa), Touring Club Italiano, Milano 2003. ISBN 88-365-2767-1
