= Monticchiello =

- Frazione
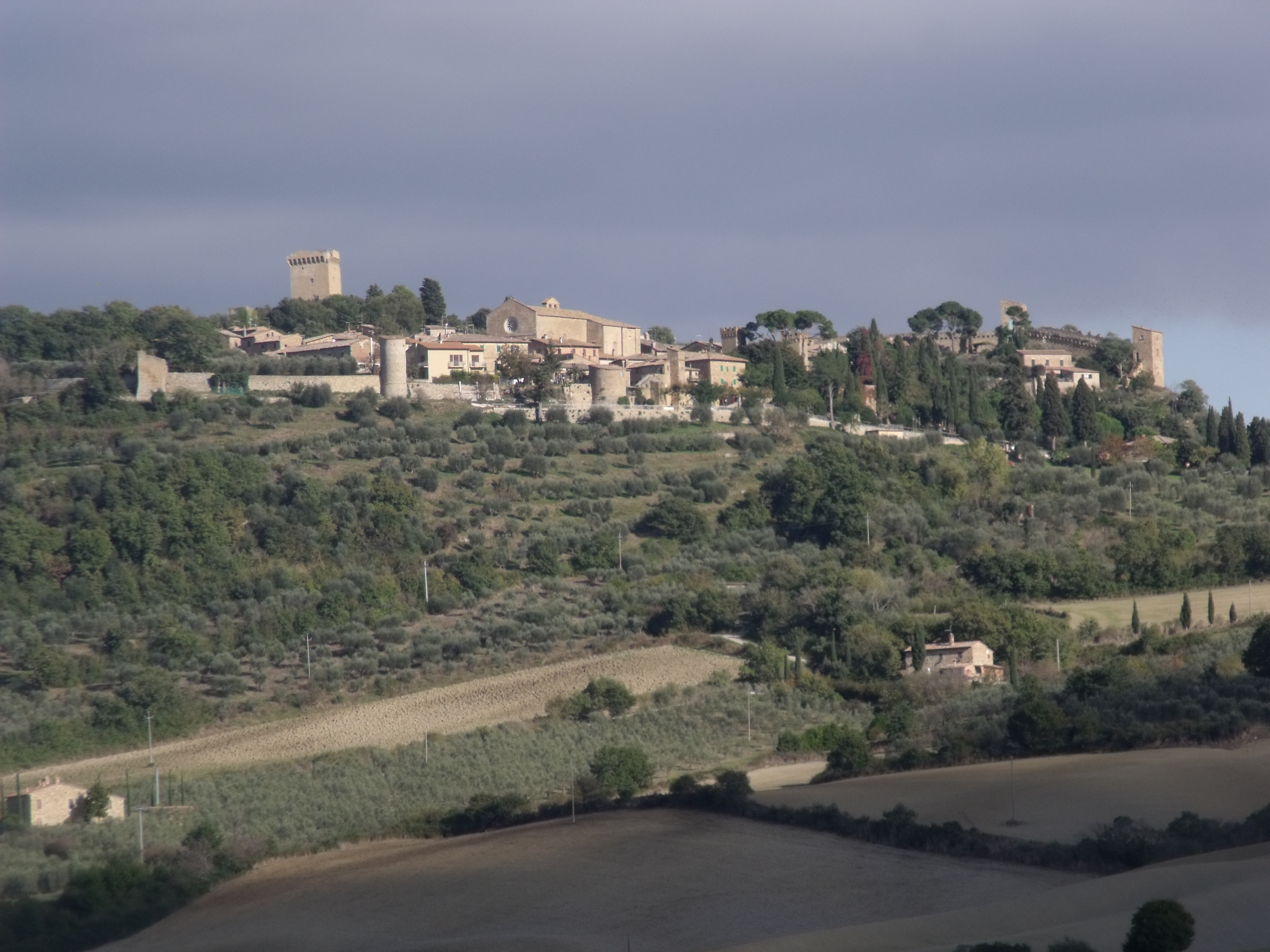
- View of Monticchiello

- Location of Monticchiello in Italy
- Coordinates: 43°04′06″N 11°43′31″E
- Country: Italy
- Region: Tuscany
- Province: Siena (SI)
- Comune: Pienza
- Elevation: 550 m (1,800 ft)

Population (2011)
  - Total: 202
- Demonym: Montichiellesi
- Time zone: UTC+1 (CET)
  - Summer (DST): UTC+2 (CEST)

Monticchiello is a village in Tuscany, central Italy, administratively a frazione of the comune of Pienza, province of Siena. At the time of the 2001 census its population was 213.

Monticchiello is about 60 km from Siena and 8 km from Pienza.
