= Agostino da Siena =

Italian architect and sculptor

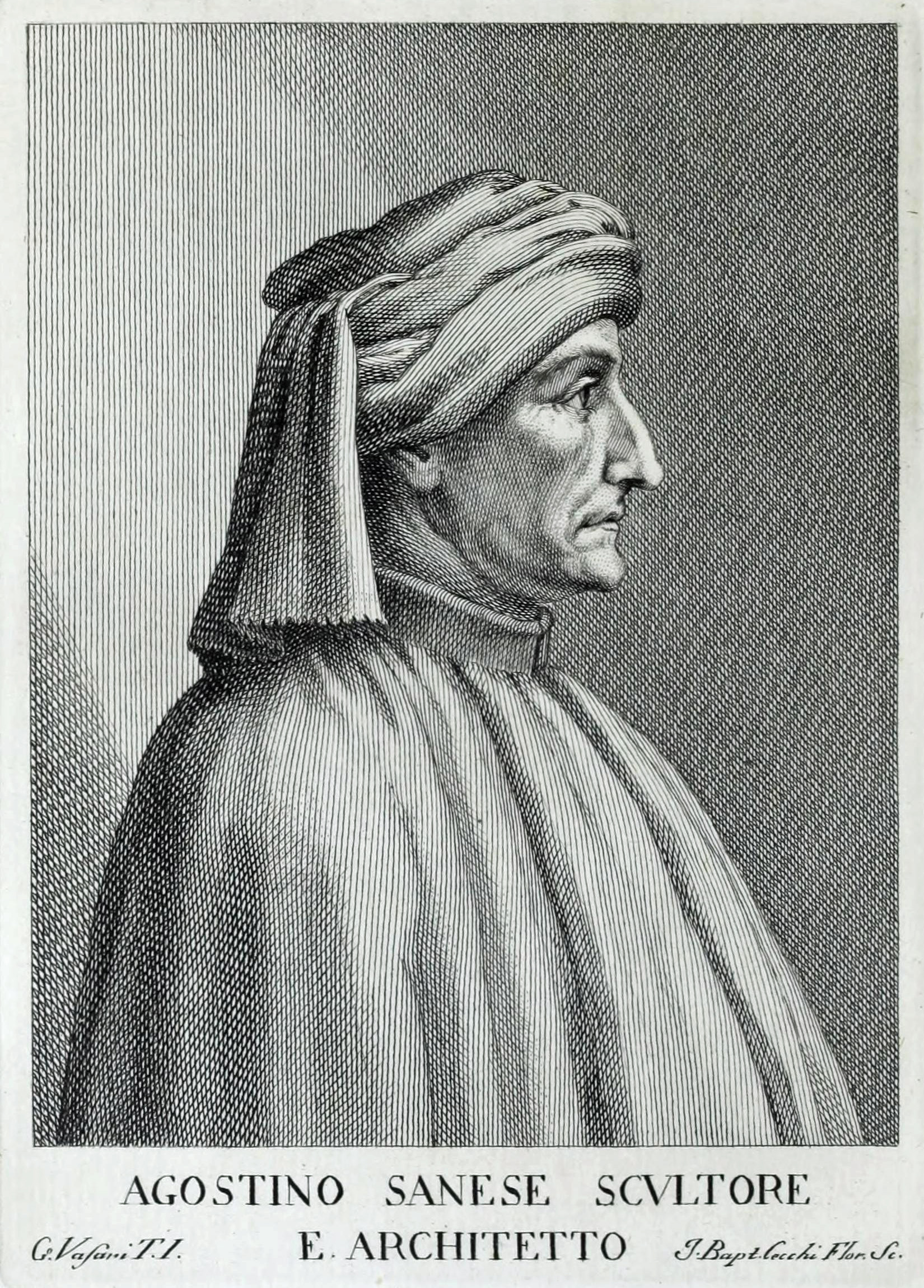
Agostino da Siena

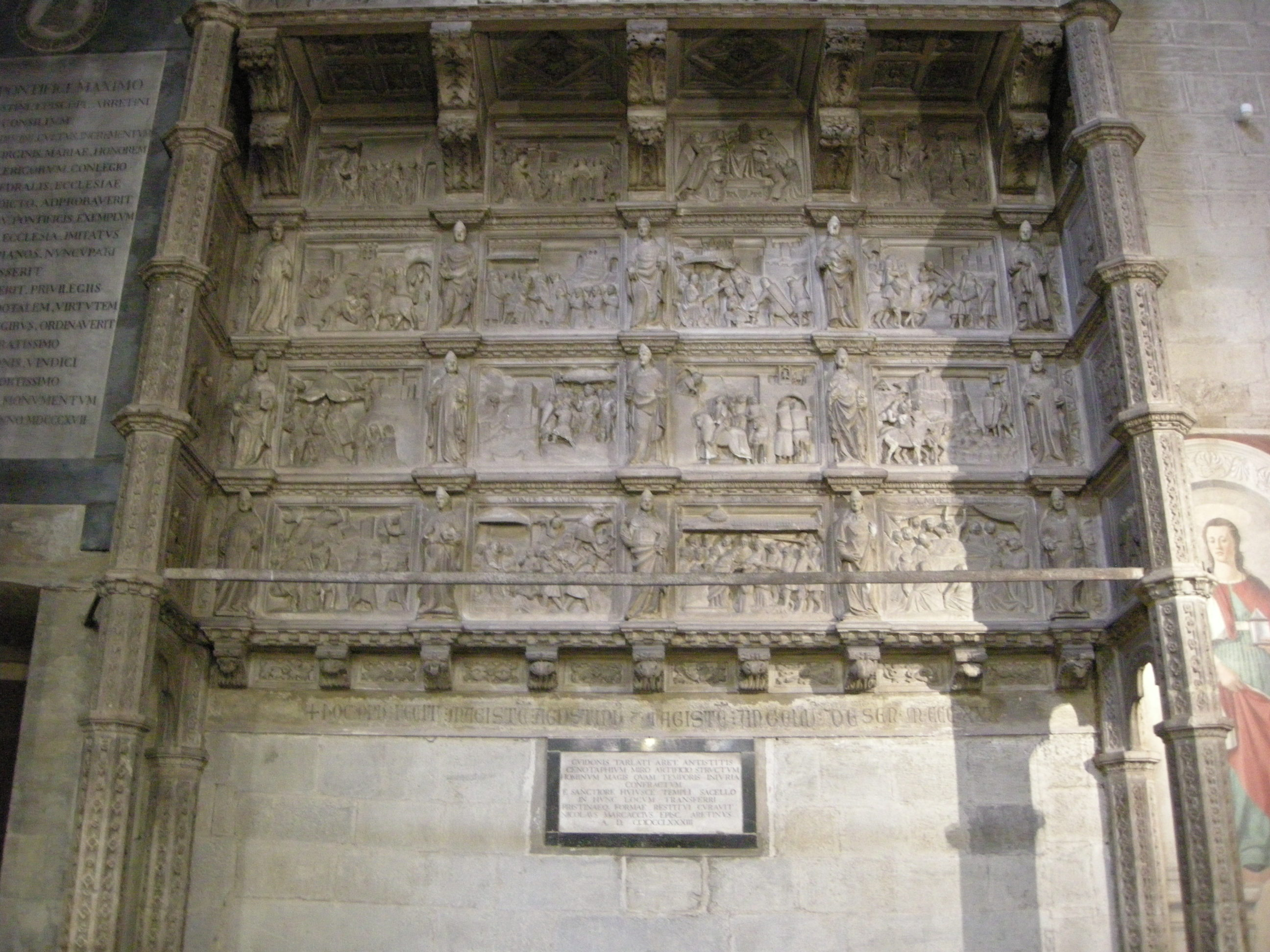
The Tarlati Cenotaph in the Cathedral of Arezzo.

Agostino da Siena or Agostino di Giovanni (c. 1285 – c. 1347) was an Italian architect and sculptor, active between 1310 and 1347.

== Biography ==
According to the Italian Renaissance biographer Giorgio Vasari, Agostino was born into a Sienese family of sculptors and architects, and studied in the workshop of Giovanni Pisano. In 1285, aged only fifteen, he would collaborate in the façade of the Cathedral of Siena with Giovanni. However, modern scholars assign his birth around 1285 and that he perhaps studied in the workshop of Camaino di Crescentino, the father of Tino di Camaino.

He is often documented as collaborator of other artists, such as Agnolo di Ventura, with whom he executed the cenotaph of Guido Tarlati in the Cathedral of Arezzo (signed and dated 1330). Vasari mentions Agnolo and Agostino in several commissions from the commune of Siena, including the Porta Romana and the Torre del Mangia; his collaboration at the construction is documented in 1339. He is also mentioned in regard with the construction of fortifications at Massa Marittima.

Agostino's exact date of death is unknown, although a document of 27 June 1347 mentions him as no more living. His sons Giovanni and Domenico were also sculptors.

== Sources ==
- Romano, S. "Agostino di Giovanni". Enciclopedia dell'Arte Medievale. Vol. I. pp. 232–234.
