= Pieve, Corsignano =

Church in Pienza, Italy

Coordinates: 43°04′37″N 11°40′17″E

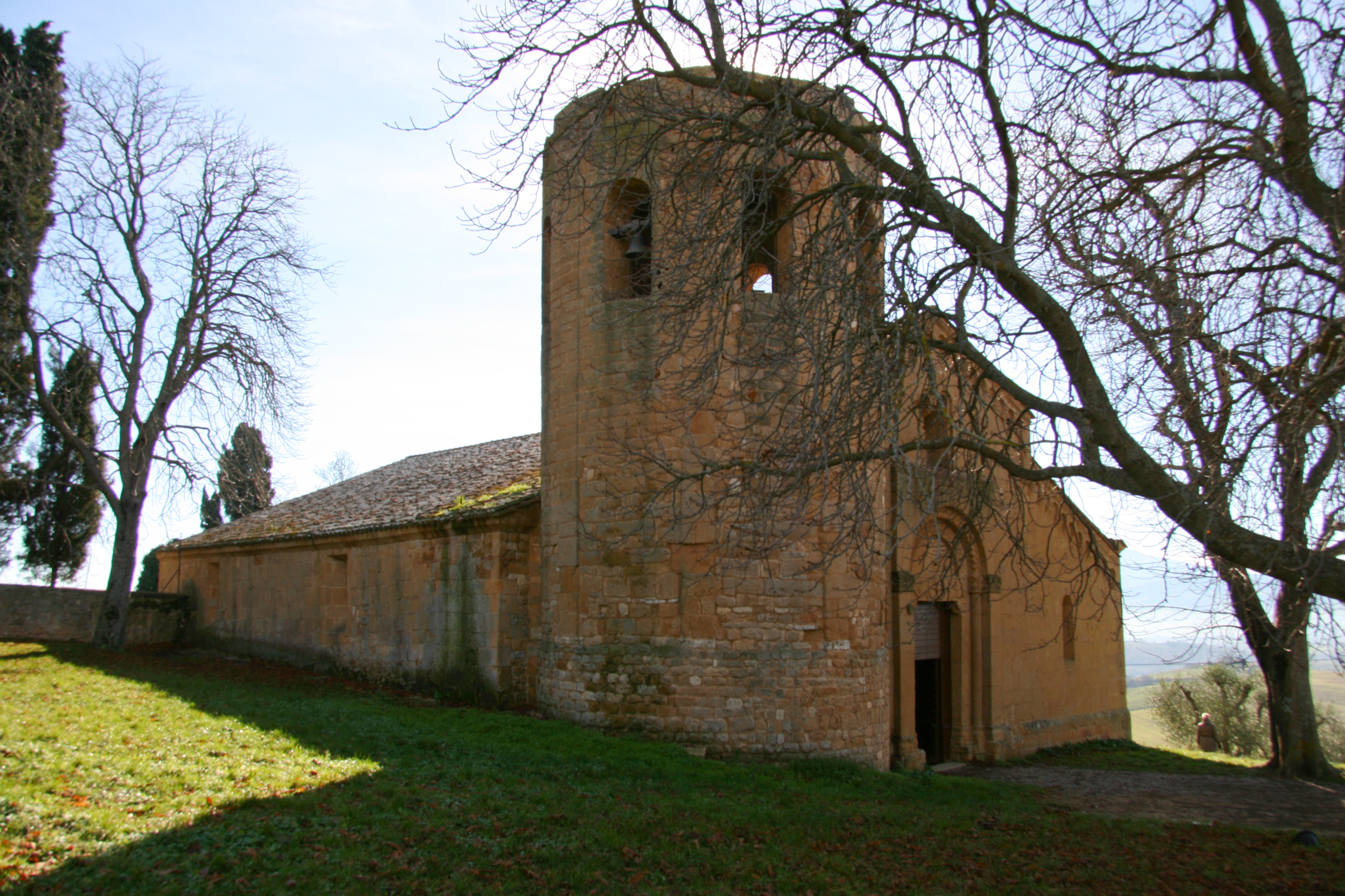

The Pieve di Corsignano is a Romanesque-style, Roman Catholic pieve, that is rural parish church, located in the frazione of Corsignano, within the town limits of Pienza, province of Siena, region of Tuscany, Italy. The church is dedicated in the honor of Saints Vito and Modesto.

A church at this site is mentioned to date to the 7th century. The present building appears to have been built in the 12th century. The church has a central nave and two aisles each leading to an apse. Of note is the cylindrical, bastion-like bell-tower. The interior is bare, but the entrance portal has Romanesque era decorations. Both Pope Pius II and his nephew Pope Pius III were baptized at the baptismal font.
