= Giovanni di Agostino =

Italian sculptor

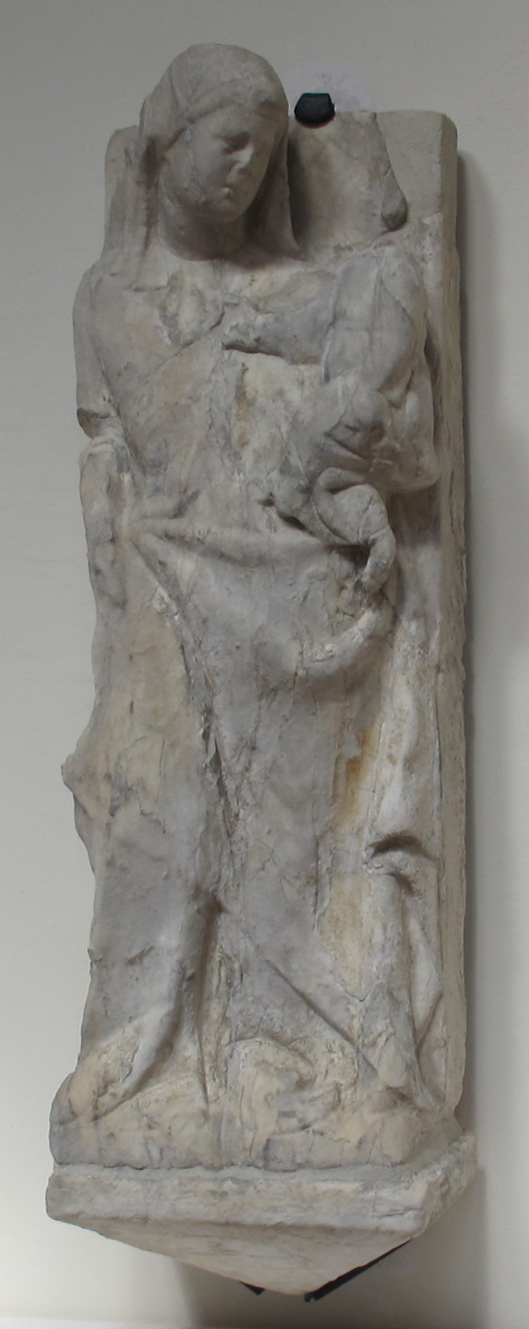
Madonna and Child, Pinacoteca Nazionale di Siena

Giovanni di Agostino, or Giovanni D'Agostino (c. 1310–c. 1370) was an Italian gothic art sculptor in Siena.

Giovanni was the son of sculptor and architect Agostino da Siena (c. 1285 – c. 1347; also known as Agostino di Giovanni) and the sculptor brother of Domenico di Agostino. Like the rest of his family, most of his work was sculptural commissions of the newly built Gothic Siena Cathedral. He sculpted a monument to Bishop Guido Tarlati in 1330. He also rendered a relief entitled Madonna and Child with Saints Catherine and John the Baptist between 1340 and 1348.
