= Pienza =

- Comune
- Comune di Pienza
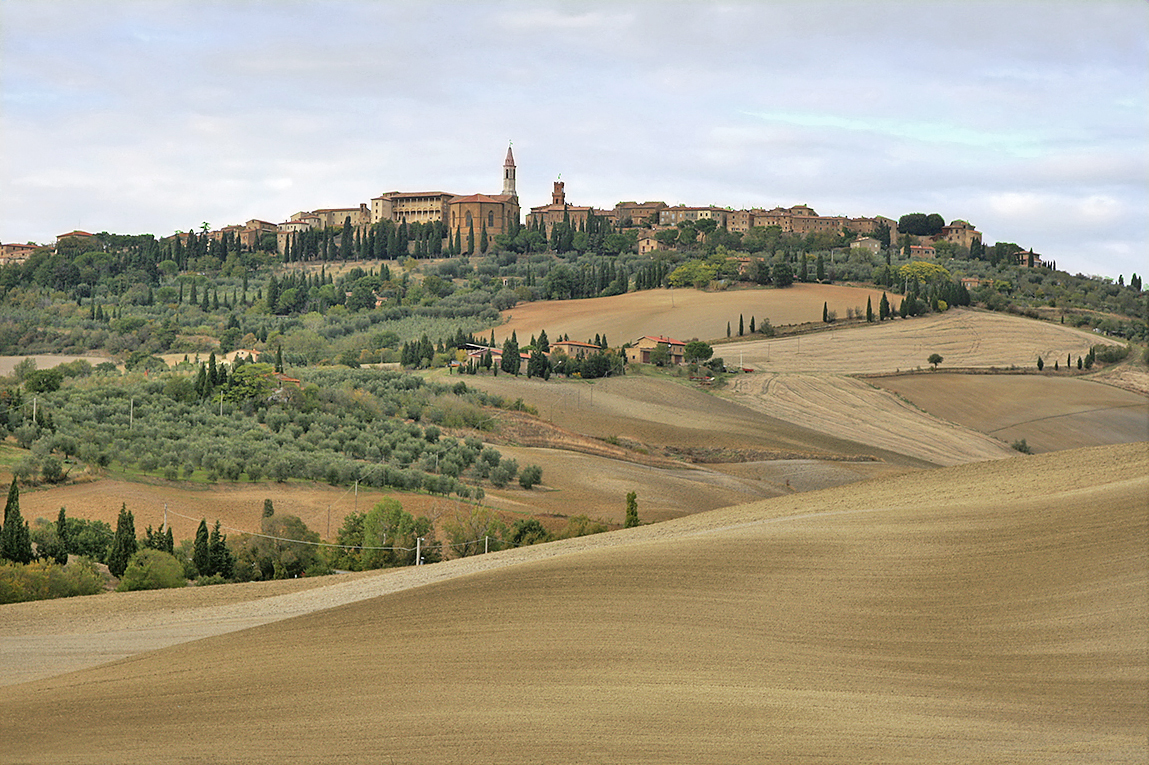

- Coat of arms

- Location within Italy Location within Tuscany
- Coordinates: 43°04′43″N 11°40′44″E
- Country: Italy
- Region: Tuscany
- Province: Siena (SI)
- Frazioni: Cosona, La Foce, Monticchiello, Palazzo Massaini, Spadaletto

Government
  - Mayor: Manolo Garosi

Area
  - Total: 122.96 km^{2} (47.48 sq mi)
- Elevation: 491 m (1,611 ft)

Population (28 February 2017)
  - Total: 2,091
  - Density: 17.01/km^{2} (44.04/sq mi)
- Demonym: Pientini
- Time zone: UTC+1 (CET)
  - Summer (DST): UTC+2 (CEST)
- Postal code: 53026
- Dialing code: 0578
- Patron saint: St. Andrew the Apostle
- Saint day: November 30
- Website: Official website

UNESCO World Heritage Site
- Official name: Historic Centre of the City of Pienza
- Criteria: Cultural: (i)(ii)(iv)
- Reference: 789
- Inscription: 1996 (20th Session)
- Area: 4.41 ha (10.9 acres)

Pienza (Italian pronunciation: [piˈɛntsa]) is a town and comune in the province of Siena, Tuscany, in the historical region of Val d'Orcia. Situated between the towns of Montepulciano and Montalcino, it is considered the "touchstone of Renaissance urbanism".

In 1996, UNESCO declared the town a World Heritage Site, and in 2004 the entire valley, the Val d'Orcia, was included on the list of UNESCO's World Cultural Landscapes.

== History ==
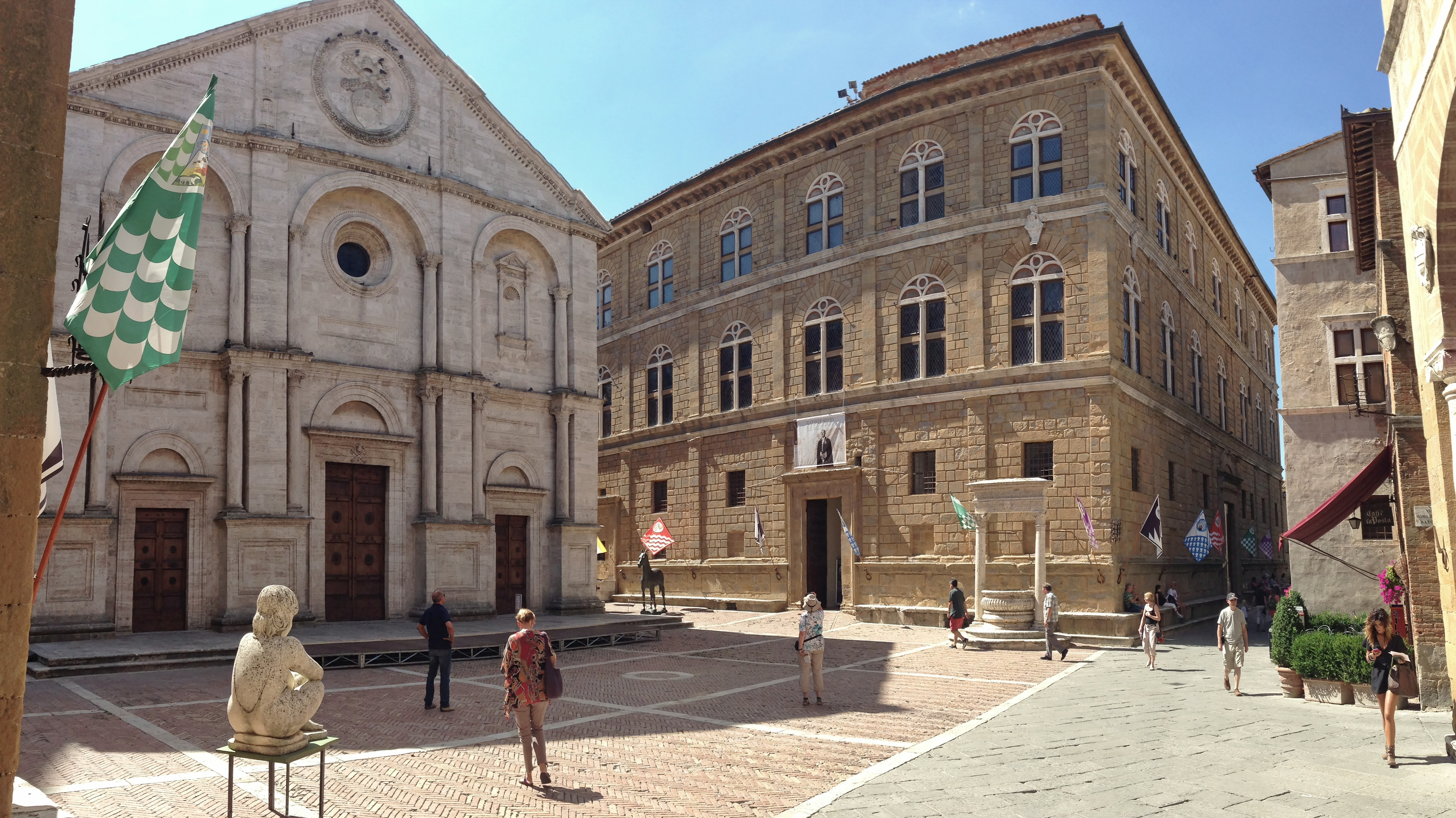
Central piazza

Before the village was renamed Pienza its name was Corsignano. It is first mentioned in documents from the 9th century. Around 1300 parts of the village became property of the Piccolomini family after Enghelberto d'Ugo Piccolomini had received the fief of Montertari in Val d'Orcia from the emperor Frederick II in 1220. In the 13th century Franciscans settled down in Corsignano.

In 1405 Aeneas Silvius Piccolomini (Italian: Enea Silvio Piccolomini) was born in Corsignano, a Renaissance humanist born into an exiled Sienese family, who later became Pope Pius II. Once he became Pope, Piccolomini had the entire village rebuilt as an ideal Renaissance town and renamed it Pienza ("city of Pius"). Intended as a retreat from Rome, it represents the first application of humanist urban planning concepts, creating an impetus for planning that was adopted in other Italian towns and cities and eventually spread to other European centers.

The rebuilding was done by Florentine architect Bernardo Gambarelli (known as Bernardo Rossellino) who may have worked with the humanist and architect Leon Battista Alberti, although there are no documents to prove it for sure. Alberti was in the employ of the Papal Curia at the time and served as an advisor to Pius. Construction started about 1459. Pope Pius II consecrated the Duomo on 29 August 1462, during his long summer visit. He included a detailed description of the structures in his Commentaries, written during the last two years of his life.

In 2023, Pienza faced a significant controversy when its centuries-old clock tower bells were silenced at night due to tourist complaints about noise from those staying in nearby hotels. The decision stirred debate among residents, with some expressing nostalgia for the nightly tolls that had been a part of their lives for generations.

== Main sights ==
=== Palazzo Piccolomini ===
The trapezoidal piazza is defined by four buildings. The principal residence, Palazzo Piccolomini, is on the west side. It has three stories, articulated by pilasters and entablature courses, with a twin-lighted cross window set within each bay. This structure is similar to Alberti's Palazzo Rucellai in Florence and other later palaces. Noteworthy is the internal court of the palazzo. The back of the palace, to the south, is defined by loggia on all three floors that overlook an enclosed Italian Renaissance garden with Giardino all'italiana era modifications, and views into the distant landscape of the Val d'Orcia and Pope Pius's beloved Monte Amiata beyond. Below this garden is a vaulted stable that had stalls for 100 horses.

=== The Duomo ===
The Duomo (Cathedral), which dominates the center of the piazza, has a facade that is one of the earliest designed in the Renaissance manner. Although the tripartite division is conventional, the use of pilasters and of columns, standing on high dados and linked by arches, was novel for the time. The bell tower, however, has a Germanic flavor as is the layout of the Hallenkirche plan, a "triple-nave" plan where the side aisles are almost as tall as the nave; Pius, before he became pope, served many years in Germany and praised the effects of light admitted into the German hall churches in his Commentari. Works of art in the duomo include five altar paintings from the Sienese School, by Sano di Pietro, Matteo di Giovanni, Vecchietta and Giovanni di Paolo. The Baptistry, dedicated as usual to San Giovanni, is located next to the apse of the church.

=== Palazzo Vescovile ===
Pius encouraged cardinals to build palazzi to complete the city. Palazzo Vescovile, on the third side of the piazza, was built by Cardinal Rodrigo Borgia, at the time Church Vice Chancellor and the future Pope Alexander VI, to comply with the request by Pope Pius II for the Cardinals to have a residence in the town. It became the residence of the Bishop of Pienza when the town was elevated to a bishopric in 1462. It is now home to the Diocesan Museum, and the Museo della Cattedrale. The collection includes local textile work as well as religious artifacts. Paintings include a 12th-century painted crucifix from the Abbey of San Pietro in Vollore, 14th century works by Pietro Lorenzetti (Madonna with Child) and Bartolo di Fredi (Madonna della Misericordia). There are also important works from the 14th and 15th centuries, including a Madonna attributed to Luca Signorelli.

=== Palazzo Comunale ===
Across from the church is the town hall, or Palazzo Comunale. When Corsigniano was given the status of an official city, a Palazzo was required that would be in keeping with the "city's" new urban position, although it was certainly more for show than anything else. It has a three-arched loggia on the ground floor facing the Cathedral and above it is the council chamber. It also has a brick bell tower that is shorter than its counterpart at the cathedral, to symbolize the superior power of the church. The set-back addition to the tower dates from 1599. It is likely that Bernardo Rossellino designed the Palazzo Comunale to be a free standing civic mediator between the religious space before the cathedral and secular market square to its rear.

The travertine well in the Piazza carries the Piccolomini family crest, and was widely copied in Tuscany during the following century. The well-head resembles a fluted, shallow Etruscan Bowl. The flanking Corinthian support a classical entablature columns whose decorations are clearly based upon actual source materials.

=== Other buildings ===
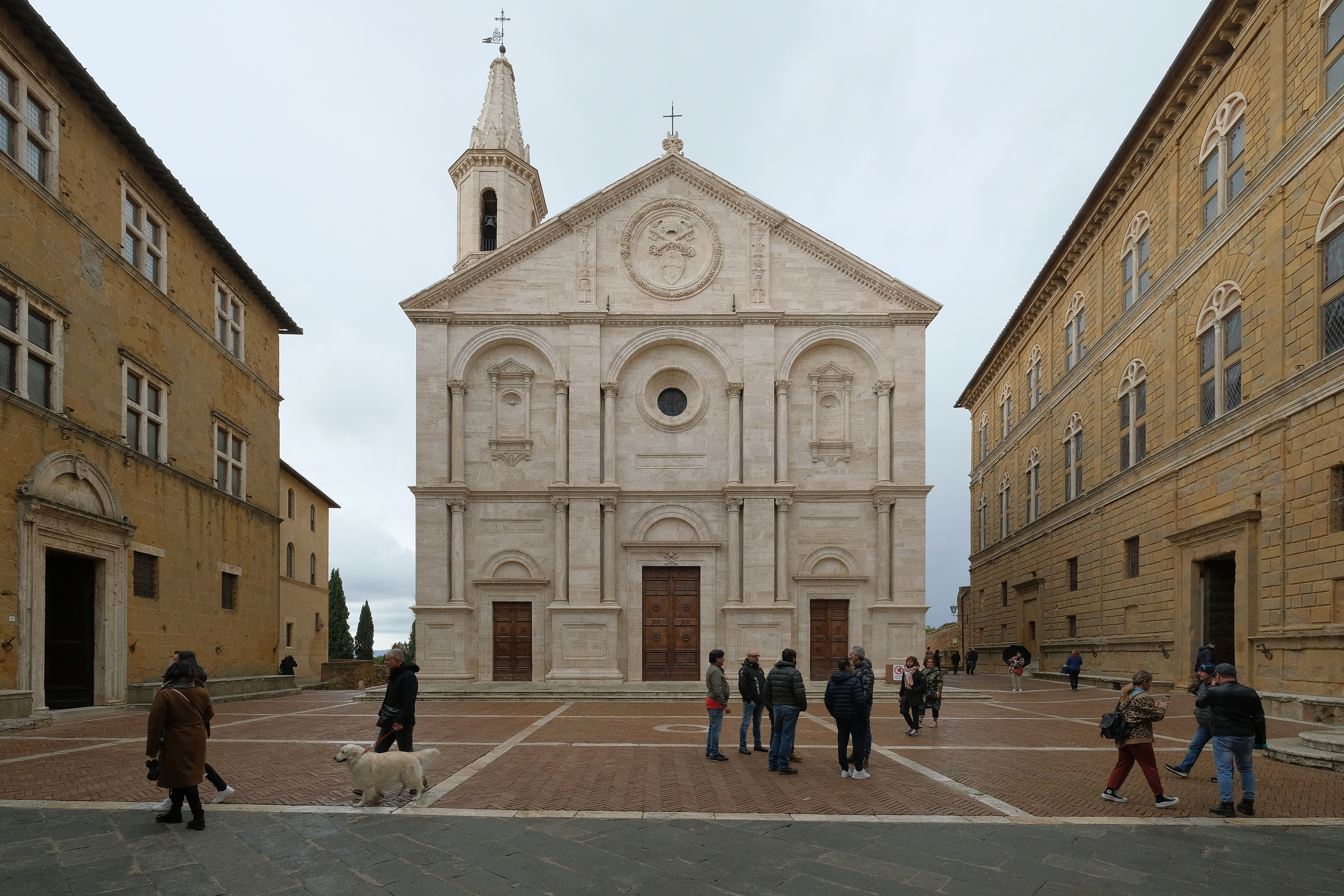
Façade of the Cathedral of Pienza

The Piccolomini gardens and Val d'Orcia

Other buildings in Pienza dating from the era of Pius II include the Ammannati Palace, named for Cardinal Jacopo Piccolomini-Ammannati, a "curial row" of three palaces (the Palazzo Jouffroy or Atrebatense belonging to Cardinal Jean Jouffroy of Arras, the Palazzo Buonconti, belonging to Vatican Treasurer Giliforte dei Buonconti, and the Palazzo Lolli constructed by apostolic secretary and papal relative Gregorio Lolli) arranged along the street behind the Bishops Palace. along the main road there are also the Palazzo Gonzaga, built in 1463 by Cardinal Francesco Gonzaga, Palazzo Forteguerri built in 1460 by Ambrogio Fortguerri, Apostolic Treasurer, and the Palazzo of Ambrogio Spannocchi, now Cittadini, again of the XV century. In the northeastern corner of Pienza, in via Casanuova, is a series of Twelve row houses constructed at the orders of the pope by the Sienese building contractor Pietro Paolo da Porrina.

About fifty meters west of the Cathedral Piazza is the church of San Francesco, with a gabled facade and Gothic portal. Among the buildings that survived from the old Corsignano, it is built on a pre-existing church that dated from the 8th century. The interior contains frescoes depicting the life of Saint Francis, those on the walls having been painted by Cristofano di Bindoccio and Meo di Pero, 14th-century artists of the Sienese School.

The Romanesque Pieve of Corsignano is located in the neighbourhood. The monastery of Sant'Anna in Camprena was founded in 1332-1334 by Bernardo Tolomei as a hermitage for the Benedictines; it was remade in the late 15th-early 16th century, and several times in the following centuries. The refectory houses frescoes by il Sodoma (1502–1503).

=== Monticchiello ===
The frazione of Monticchiello is home to a characteristic Romitorio, a series of grottoes carved in the rock by hermit monks. In the same locality is the pieve of Santi Leonardo e Cristoforo, rebuilt in the 13th century in Gothic style. The interior has frescoes from a 14th-century Sienese painter, a cyborium in the shape of a small Gothic portal and an alte 15th-century Crucifix. At San Pietro in Campo are the remains of the eponymous abbey.

Monticchiello is the subject of the documentary Spettacolo (2017).

== Municipal government ==
Montepulciano is headed by a mayor (sindaco) assisted by a legislative body, the consiglio comunale, and an executive body, the giunta comunale. Since 1995 the mayor and members of the consiglio comunale are directly elected together by resident citizens, while from 1945 to 1995 the mayor was chosen by the legislative body. The giunta comunale is chaired by the mayor, who appoints others members, called assessori. The offices of the comune are housed in a building usually called the municipio or palazzo comunale.

Since 1995 the mayor of Pienza is directly elected by citizens, originally every four, then every five years. The current mayor is Manolo Garosi (a left-wing independent), elected on 26 May 2019 with the 59.6% of the votes and re-elected on 9 June 2024 with 59.3% of the votes.

Mayor	Term start	Term end	Party
Sauro Marchetti	27 May 1990	14 June 1999	PDS
Marco Del Ciondolo	14 June 1999	8 June 2009	DS
Fabrizio Fè	8 June 2009	27 May 2019	Ind (Note: Left-wing independent.)
Manolo Garosi	27 May 2019	incumbent	Ind

== Gallery ==
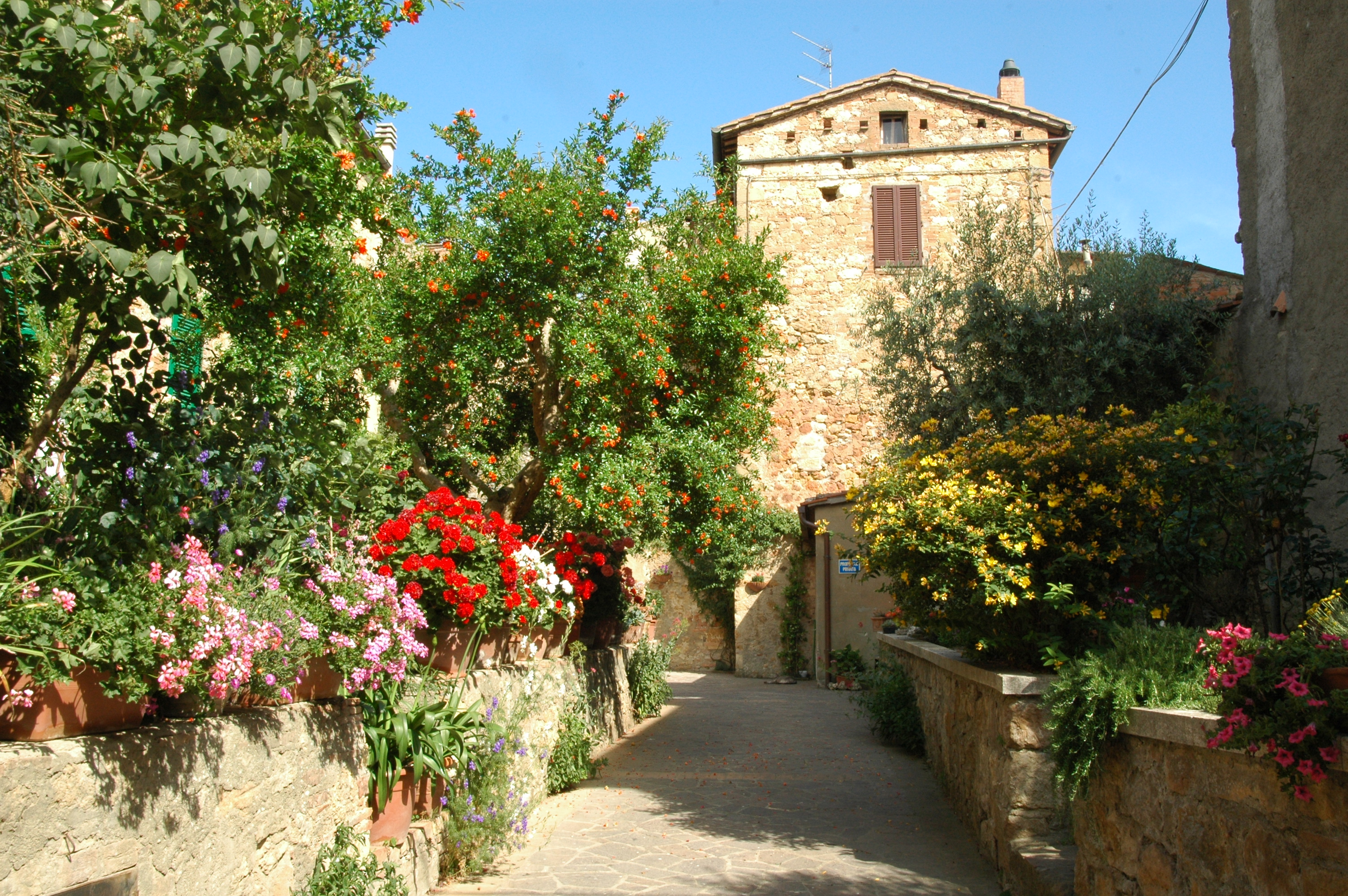
Street in the old town

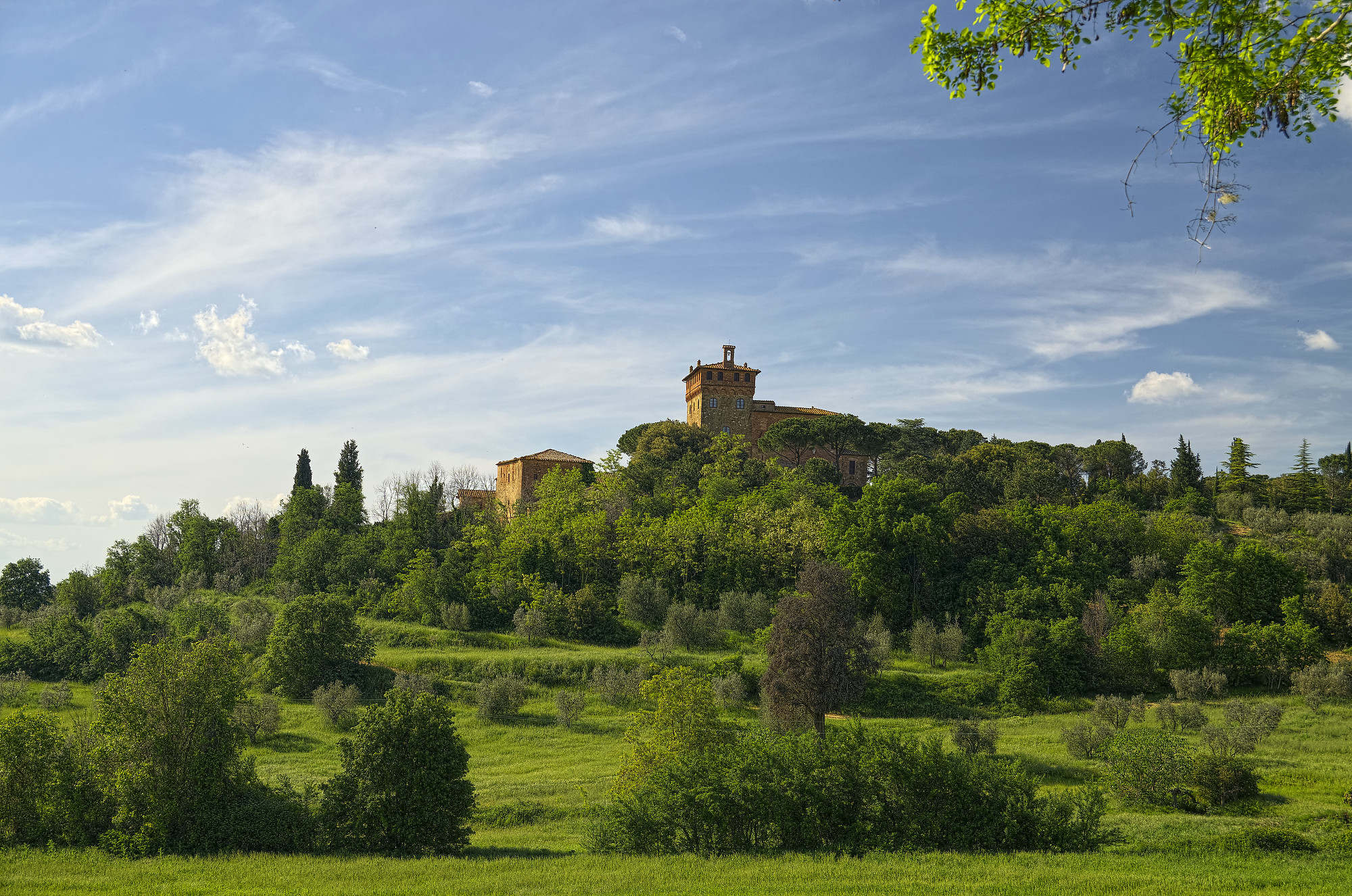
Palazzo Massaini

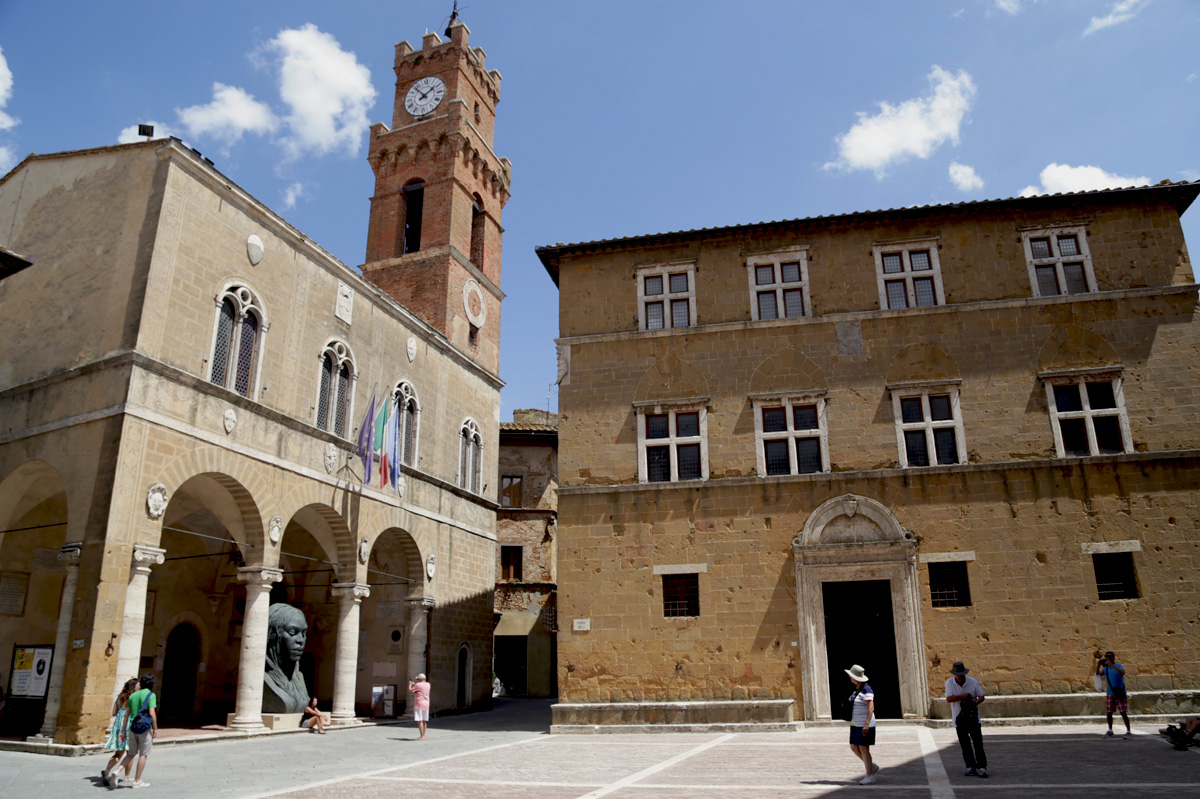
Palazzo Comunale and Palazzo Vescovile

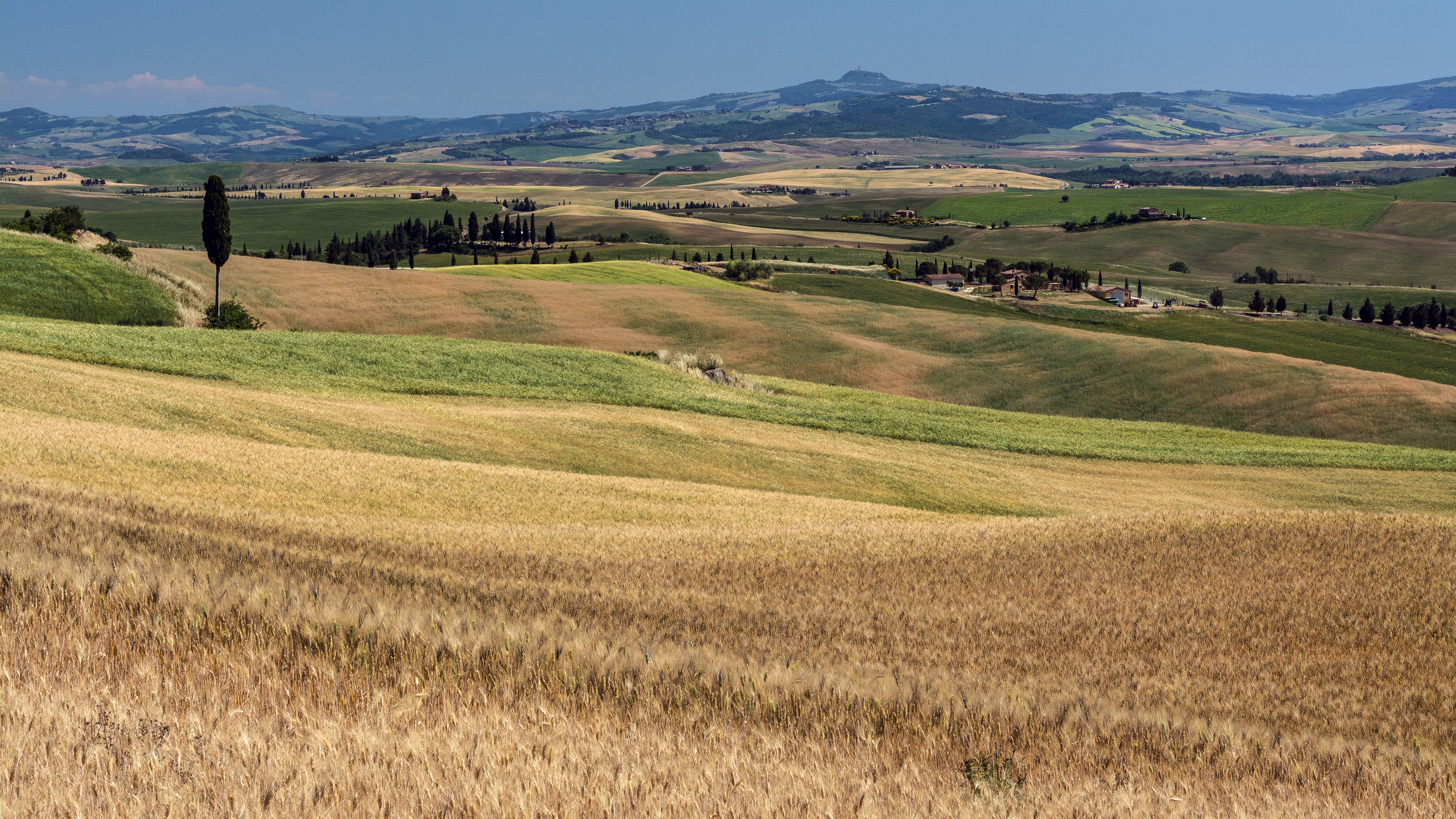
Countryside around Pienza

== Sources ==
- Adams, Nicholas (May 1985). "The Acquisition of Pienza, 1459-1464". Journal of the Society of Architectural Historians. 44 (2): 99–110.
- Adams, Nicholas (1989). "The Construction of Pienza (1459-1464) and the Consequences of Renovatio". In Zimmerman, Susan; Weissman, Ronald (eds.). Urban Life in the Renaissance. Newark: Univ. of Delaware Press. pp. 50–79.
- Carli, Enzo (1966). Pienza: la Citta di Pio II. Rome: Editalia.
- Cataldi, Giancarlo; Formichi, Fausto (2007). Pienza Forma Urbis. Florence: Aion Edizioni.
- Mack, Charles (2012). "Beyond the Monumental:The Semiotics of Papal Authority in Renaissance Pienza". Southeastern College Art Conference Review. 16 (2): 124–50.
- Mack, Charles (1987). Pienza: the Creation of a Renaissance City. Ithaca: Cornell University Press.
- Mayernik, David (2003). Timeless Cities: An Architect's Reflections on Renaissance Italy. Boulder, CO: Westview Press.
- Piccolomini, Aeneas Silvius (1959). Gabel, Leona (ed.). Memoirs of a Renaissance Pope. Translated by Gragg, Florence. New York: Capricorn Books.
- Pieper, Jan (1997). Pienza: der Entwurf einer humanistischen Weltansicht. Stuttgart: Axel Menges.
- Smith, Christine (1992). Architecture in the Culture of Early Humanism: Ethics, Aesthetics, and Eloquence, 1400-1470. Oxford: Oxford University Press.
- Tönnesmann, Andreas (2013) [First published 1990]. Pienza: Städtebau und Humanismus (in German) (3rd ed.). Munich: Hirmer. ISBN 978-3-8031-2717-4.
