= Basilica of San Francesco, Siena =

Basilica church in Siena, Tuscany, Italy

Coordinates: 43.3223°N 11.3346°E

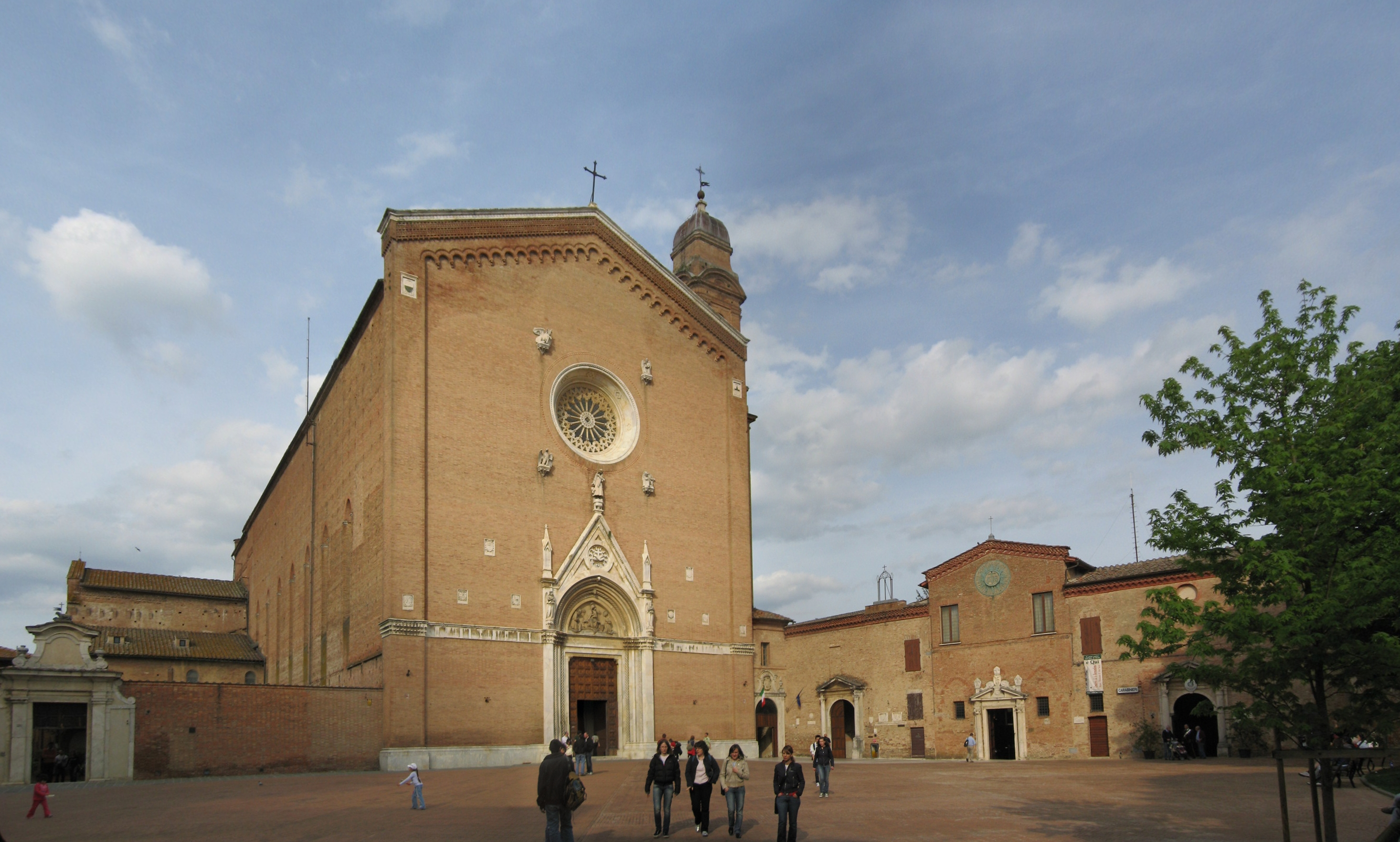
Exterior of the Basilica of San Francesco

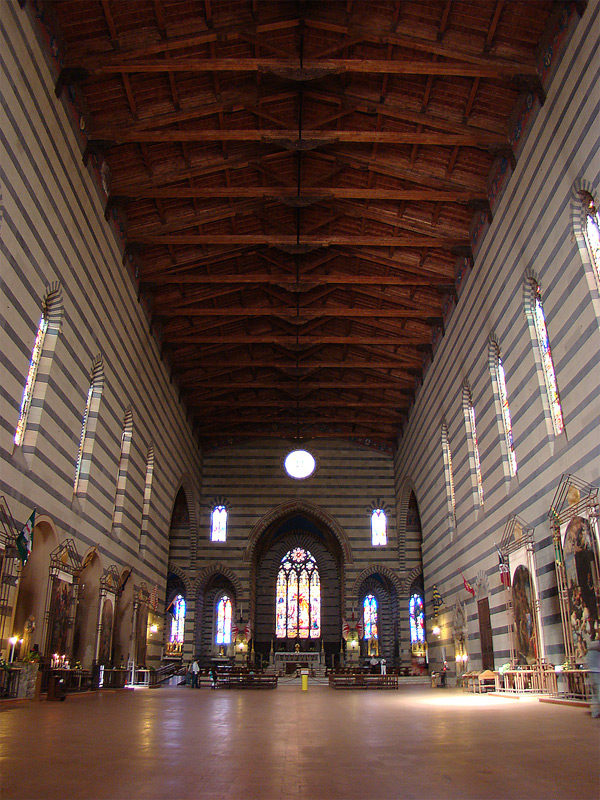
Interior of the basilica

San Francesco is a basilica church in Siena, Tuscany, Italy.

It was erected in c. 1228-1255 and later enlarged in the 14th-15th centuries, the original Romanesque edifice being turned into the current large Gothic one.

A eucharistic miracle took place involving communion hosts stolen from the church in 1730, which were later found and remain incorrupted.

== Architecture ==
The basilica is on the Egyptian Cross plan, with a nave covered by spans and a transept, according to type favoured by the Mendicant Orders, which needed spaces capable to house large crowds of faithful.

The current interior looks rather sober after a fire in 1655 and the restoration of 1885–1892, when many of the Baroque altars were demolished (some of the paintings has been however returned in recent times). The neo-Gothic façade, flanked by the 1763 campanile, dates to the early 20th century. The medieval marble decoration and the 15th century portal were removed in that occasion.

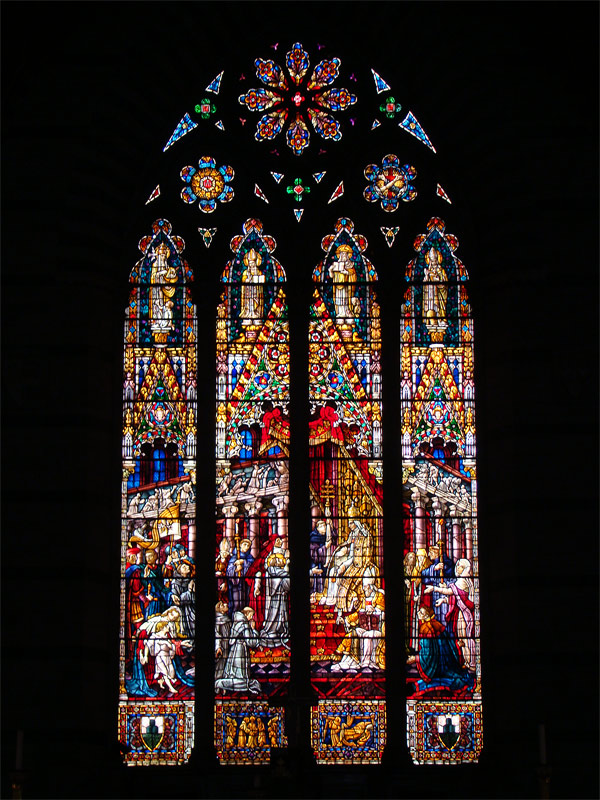
A stained glass window from the interior.

== Interior ==
The counterfaçade houses the remains of two 14th-century sepulchres, as well as two large fragmentary frescoes from the city gates of Porta Romana and Porta Pispini: a Coronation of the Virgin by Sassetta and Sano di Pietro (1447–1450) and a Nativity by Il Sodoma (1531). Also visible is the ancient 15th century portal by Francesco di Giorgio Martini.

Among the numerous artworks in the church, are Madonna with Child and Saints by Jacopo Zucchi, an expressive Crucifixion by Pietro Lorenzetti and a fresco by his brother Ambrogio, a Prayer of St James by Giuseppe Nicola Nasini, a Martyrdom of St Martina by Pietro da Cortona and a Madonna with Child frescoed by Jacopo di Mino del Pellicciaio.

In the right transept is a 14th-century marble of St Francis, from the ancient façade.
