= Cristoforo Rustici =

Italian painter

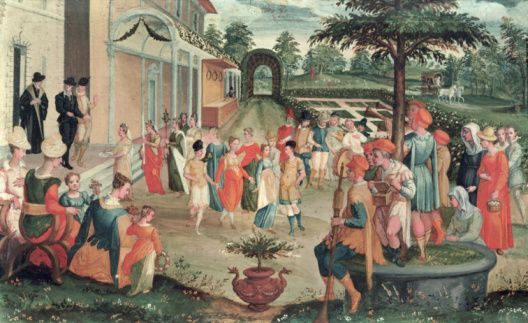
May

Cristoforo Rustici, known as il Rusticone, (1552 in Siena – 1641 in Siena) was an Italian painter active in Siena who is known for his religious compositions and allegorical scenes representing the twelve months.

== Life ==
He was born in Siena in 1552 in an artistic family of architects and artists originally from Piacenza who had settled in Siena in the 16th century. His father Lorenzo, known as Il Rustico or Lorenzo di Cristoforo Rustici, was a prominent Renaissance painter of stucco and grotesque decorations. His younger brother Vincenzo Rustici (1556–1632) was also a painter. His nephew Francesco Rustici was one of the leading followers of Caravaggio working in Siena.

He trained with his father, Lorenzo Rustici and later with il Sodoma. He is mainly known for a series of compositions representing the twelve months. He also produced many religious works for the local churches.
