= Lorenzo Rustici =

Italian painter (1512–1572)

Lorenzo Rustici (1512–1572) was an Italian painter of the Renaissance period, active mainly in his native city of Siena, Italy. He was also known as Il Rustico or Lorenzo di Cristoforo Rustici. His sons were Vincenzo and Cristoforo Rustici. A specific contract for his work in painting the ceiling of the Loggia della Corte de Mercanti in Siena is known. He painted in the church of San Pietro alla Magione in Siena.
