= Vincenzo Rustici =

Italian painter

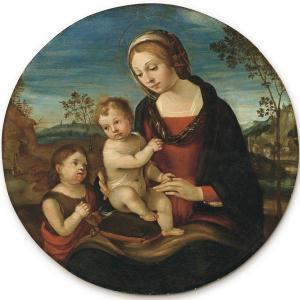
Madonna and Child with St John the Baptist

Vincenzo Rustici (Siena, 1556 – Siena, 1632) was an Italian painter active in Siena. He was known for his religious compositions as well as his vedute showing public celebrations in Siena.

== Life ==
Precise details about the life and career of Vincenzo Rustici are scarce.

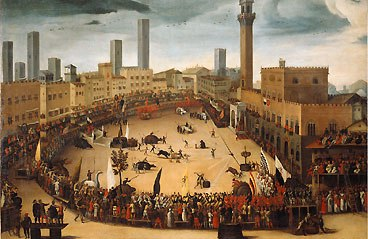
Palio di Siena

He was born in Siena in 1556 in an artistic family of architects and artists originally from Piacenza who had settled in Siena in the 16th century. His father Lorenzo, known as Il Rustico or Lorenzo di Cristoforo Rustici, was a prominent Renaissance painter of stucco and grotesque decorations. His older brother Cristoforo, also known as Il Rusticcone (1552 - 1641), was also a painter.

After his sister Aurelia married the eminent Sienese painter Alessandro Casolani in 1582, Rustici probably started working in the workshop of his brother-in-law. He may have executed in the studio works destined for a less demanding clientele. Upon the death of Casolani in 1606, he completed Casolani’s Resurrection of Lazarus in the Basilica of Saint Francis in Siena. Alessandro Casolani himself was influenced by the work of Domenico Beccafumi.

His son Francesco trained with him and was one of the leading followers of Caravaggio working in Siena. In the period during which his son Francesco worked in his workshop, Vincenzo Rustici's hand was initially difficult to distinguish from that of his son.

In December 1616, Vincenzo Rustici was commissioned to repaint three of the original fresco’s of Pinturicchio in the Chapel of Saint John the Baptist in the Siena Cathedral.

== Work ==
Vincenzo Rustici was a painter of history subjects as well as vedute, i.e. city views. He worked mainly in Siena, where his best-known works are preserved.

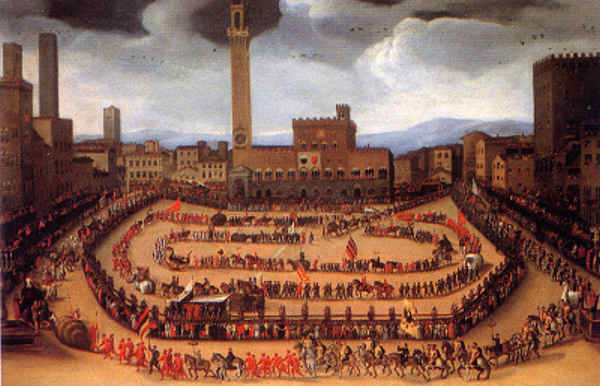
Procession of the Contrade

He is now mainly known for two canvases depicting respectively the Palio di Siena (a downtown horse race with bull hunt) and the Procession of the Contrade in the Piazza del Campo held on 15 August 1546 (Palazzo Salimbeni, Collection of the Banca Monte dei Paschi, Siena). These works provide an important record of these public festivities at the time. Vincenzo Rustici relied on a description in a contemporary letter by Cecchino Cartaio (‘Cecchino the Stationer’) to create these canvases years after the events depicted in them occurred. These paintings were originally preserved in the Villa del Poggio Imperiale in Florence, where they are documented as early as 1654.

Rustici created a number of depictions of the Madonna and Child with saints, a subject popular with Sienese artists such as Casolani. An example is the Madonna and Child with Saints Augustine, John the Evangelist and Joseph (Sotheby's auction 9 June 2011 in New York, lot 31), which has been attributed to Rustici on stylistic grounds as the facial type of the Virgin corresponds closely to Vincenzo's signed Pietà in Siena. Another example is the Madonna and Child with St John the Baptist, which appears to deliberately cite interpretations of the same theme by 15th century painters active in Siena such as the Master of the Story of Griselda.
