= Porta Romana, Siena =

Coordinates: 43.313264°N 11.339478°E

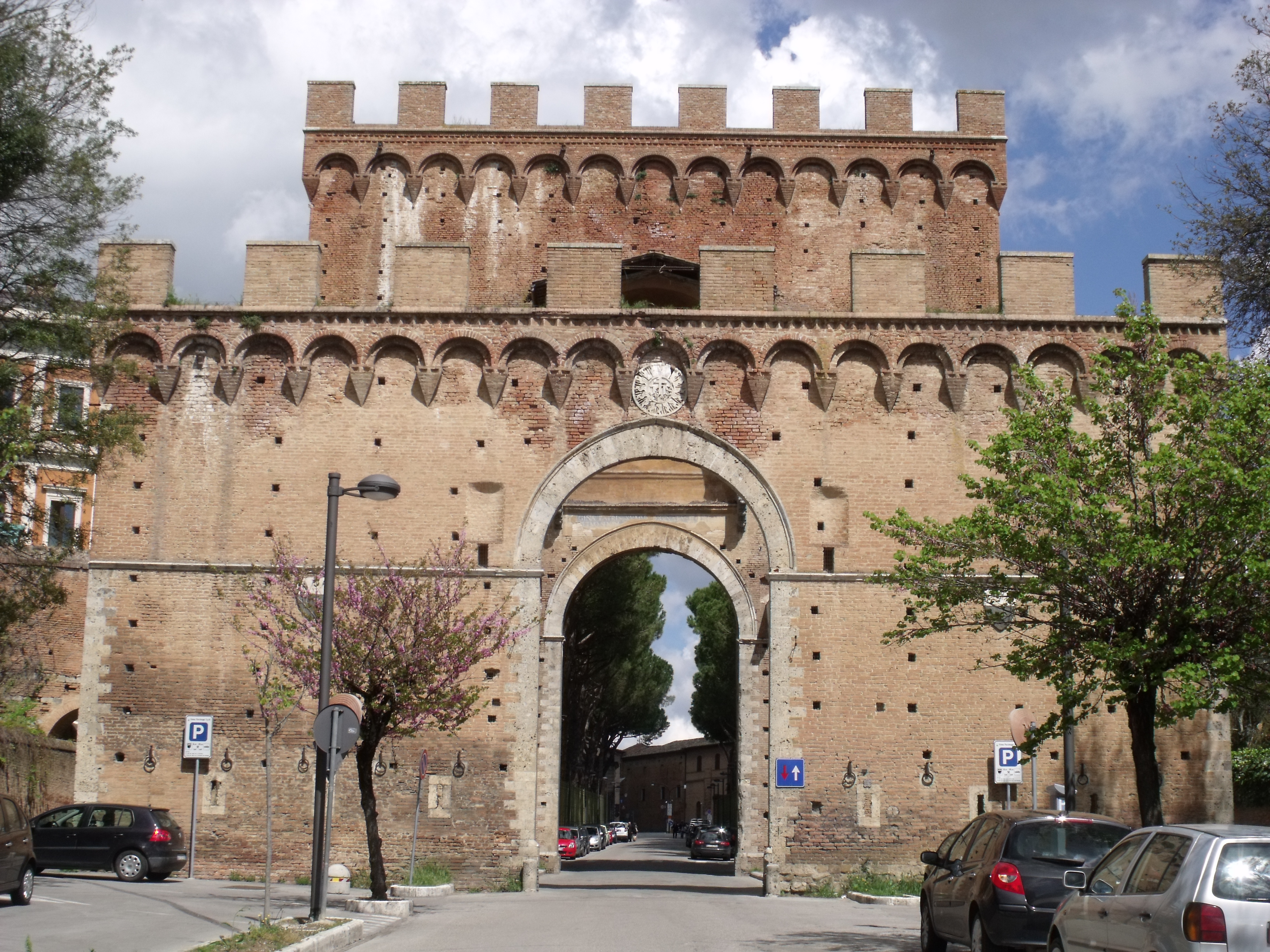
Porta Romana

Porta Romana is one of the portals in the medieval Walls of Siena. It is located on Via Cassia in Siena, region of Tuscany, Italy. The gate exits near the Basilica of San Clemente and leads south out of town to Via Enea Silvio Piccolomini.

== History ==
The gate was built in 1327-1328 by Agnolo di Ventura and Agostino di Giovanni, and has a crenellated roofline with machicolation in front gate. The gate is complex, with two separate portals, separated by a small inner court, with the inner gatehouse taller than the outer one. The large arches are faced with travertine marble. The courtyard is surrounded by arrowslits. It was likely that the gate doors could be opened sequentially. The outer portal has a round bas-relief with the Roman Catholic IHS Christogram inside a sun symbol (San Bernardino Christogram).

In 1417, Taddeo di Bartolo was commissioned to paint the Madonna icon on the inner portal, dedicated to the protection of the city. The painting was further retouched by Sassetta and later Sano di Pietro who completed it in 1466. The painting depicted a Glory of Angels in lower arches, and a Coronation of the Virgin in the central arch. Due to the state of decay, the remaining fresco was transferred in 1978 to the Basilica of San Francesco, Siena.

== Bibliography ==
- Toscana. Guida d'Italia (Guida rossa), Touring Club Italiano, Milano 2003. ISBN 88-365-2767-1
- Fonte: scheda nei "Luoghi della Fede", Regione Toscana
