= Cristoforo di Bindoccio =

Italian painter

Cristoforo di Bindoccio, also called Cristoforo del Maestro Bindoccio or Cristofano Malabarba, (active 1360 - 1409) was an Italian painter active in Siena and Pienza.

== Career ==
He worked with Francesco di Vannuccio and Meo di Piero. There is an altarpiece (circa 1370) attributed the Crostoforo and Meo di Piero at the Barnes Foundation.
