= Meo di Piero =

Italian painter (1356–1407)

- Born: Meo di Piero ca. 14th cent. Siena, Italy
- Died: ca. 15th cent. Italy
- Known for: Painting

Meo di Pero, also called Meo di Piero (active 1356–1407) was an Italian painter active in Siena in a Gothic style. He worked in the studio of Cristoforo di Bindoccio. All the latter paintings are generally co-attributed to Meo, since no independent work is known.

Di Piero is stated to be the son of the painter pittore Pero o Piero di Castellano da Gerfalco, documented as part of a guild by 1363, but dead by 1370. Meo is registered in the Sienese guild of painters in either 1356 or 1389.

With Cristoforo he signed now fragmentary frescoes in the cappella delle Reliquie of Santa Maria della Scala (1370). The also painted frescoes depicting the Life of the Virgin for the church of Santa Maria a Campagnatico near Grossetano. They putatively painted frescoes depicting Life of St Francis for the apse chapel of San Francesco in Pienza. They labored together for the Siena Cathedral. They painted frescoes (between 1382 and 1398) depicting scenes from the Bible in the refectory of San Pietro alla Magione. In 1393, they were paid, along with Bartolo di Fredi, for the restoration of the Mappamondo by Ambrogio Lorenzetti in the palazzo pubblico of Siena. The frescoes depicting the Life of Christ in the Pieve of San Polo in Rosso are attributed to Cristoforo and Pero.

There is an altarpiece (circa 1370) attributed the Crostoforo and Meo di Piero at the Barnes Foundation. A Madonna and Child attributed to the pair was auctioned at the Palais Dorotheum. Frescoes in the Sala di Aristotele of the Museo Civico Archeologico e d'Arte Sacra at Palazzo Corboli of Asciano are attributed to the couple.

Similar or overlapping names for artists abound in central Italy. It is not clear if any are related. A Pietro di Maestro Meo was an illuminator in Perugia. In 1417, a Pietro di Meo, jeweler, was active in decoration of the Orvieto Cathedral. Ugolino di Prete Ilario completed the frescoes for the Cappella del Corporale (1357–1364) with the assistance of a Domenico di Meo, as well as with Petrucciolo di Marco, Antonio di Andreuccio and Pietro di Puccio.
