= Francesco Rustici =

Italian painter

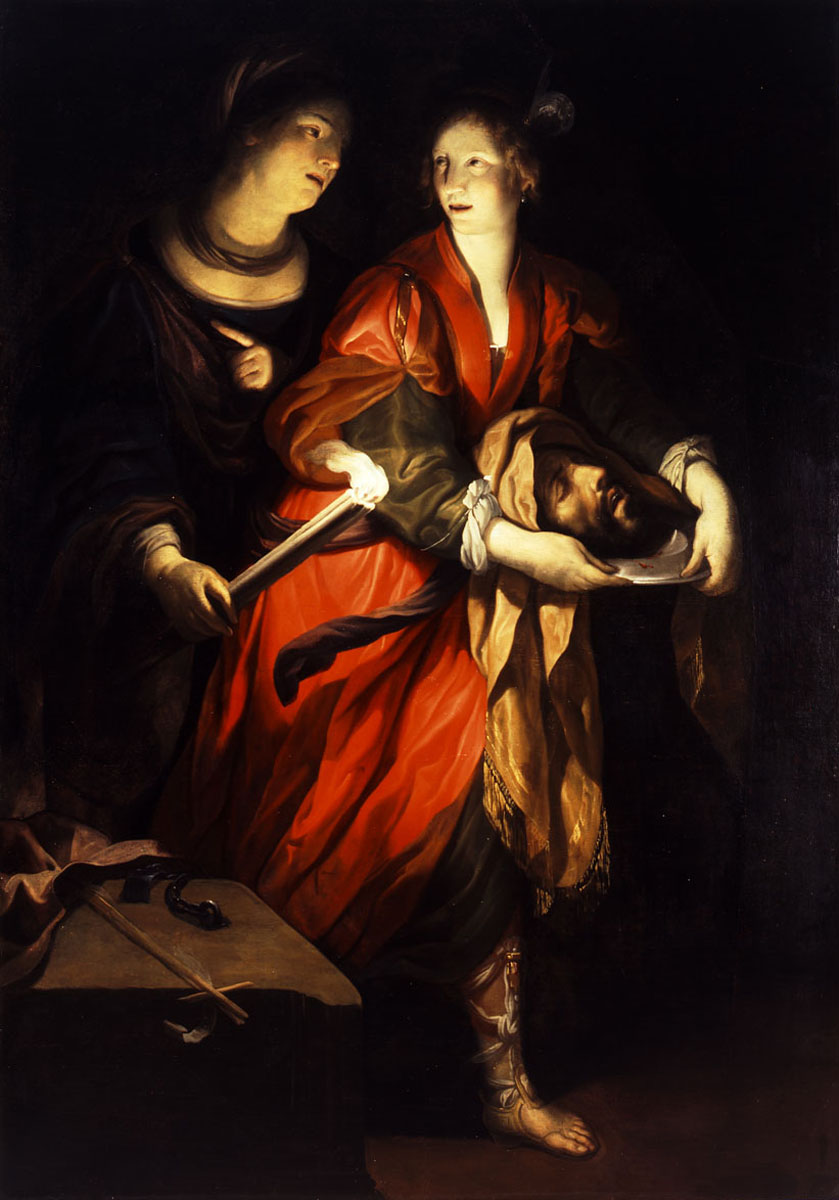
Salome

Francesco Rustici, called Il Rustichino (Siena, 1592 – Siena, 1626) was an Italian painter active in Siena. He worked on commissions for the local churches as well as from the Grand-Dukes of Tuscany. In his work he shows a preference for nocturnal effects which reveals the influence of Caravaggio and his followers, the so-called Caravaggisti.

== Life ==
Francesco Rustici was born in Siena in 1592 as the scion of an artistic family. His father Vincenzo Rustici as well as his uncle Cristoforo Rustici and his mother's brother Alessandro Casolani were all prominent painters active in Siena.

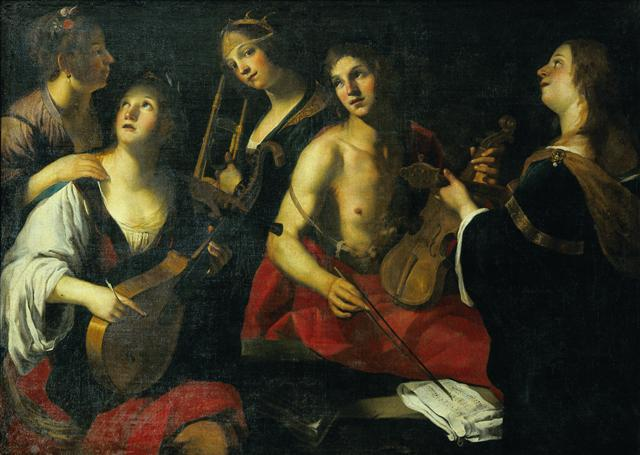
Concert, M. Žilinskas Art Gallery, Kaunas, Lithuania

He trained with his father who was the chief collaborator in the workshop of his brother-in-law Alessandro Casolani. Casolini himself was influenced by the work of Domenico Beccafumi. While working in his father's workshop, Francesco Rustici's hand was initially difficult to distinguish from that of his father. His precocious talent was spotted by Giulio Mancini, a local physician, art collector and art dealer who mentioned the young artist in his Considerazioni sulla pittura ('Thoughts on painting'), written between 1617 and 1621. It is believed that the artist spent time in Rome in the period 1624-1625. In Rome he deepened his study of other Caravaggisti such as the Dutchman Gerrit van Honthorst.

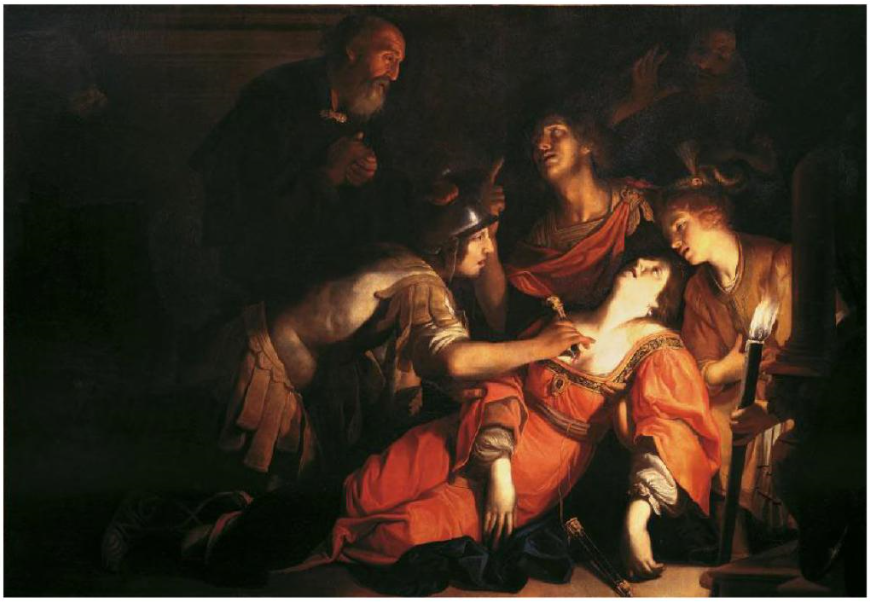
The death of Lucretia

Towards the end of his life he received commissions from Archduchess Maria Maddalena of Austria who commissioned The death of Saint Mary Magdalene and The death of Lucretia. He was also in contact with Lorenzo Magalotti, an important personage in the organization of the cultural projects of the Barberini.

== Work ==
The known oeuvre of Francesco Rustici is not numerous. His early works show the influence of his father and of Alessandro Casolani who painted in the Sienese Mannerist style. Later he came under the influence of the style of Caravaggio. This is visible in the realistic and warm humanity with which he rendered his subjects.

Another important influence on his work was Gerrit van Honthorst, who was known for his mastery of nocturnal effects, which had earned him in Italy the nickname 'Gherardo delle Notti' ("Gerard of the nights"). Rustici's handling of light followed the Dutch-Flemish model of van Honthorst and blended it with a wholly Tuscan form of Classicism. Rustichino painted a number of paintings which used the devise of the dark scene lit up by a single light source that was so favoured by tenebrists to create dramatic chiaroscuro effects.

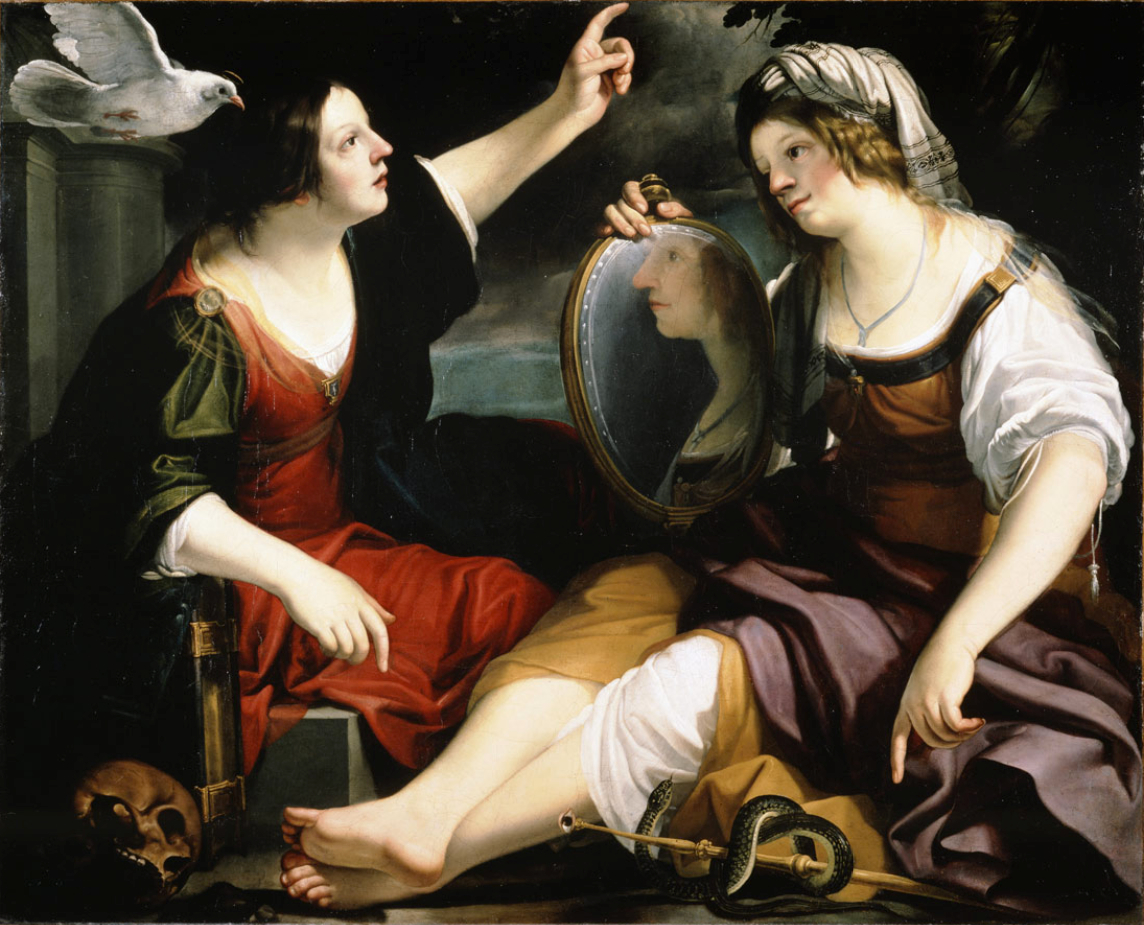
Wisdom and Prudence

Rustichino's style appears generally to have been closer to the style of Orazio Gentileschi, particularly in his use of bright and lively colours. However, he did not entirely embrace the naturalism of Gentileschi.
