= Portrait of a Man (Domenico Ghirlandaio) =

Painting by Domenico Ghirlandaio

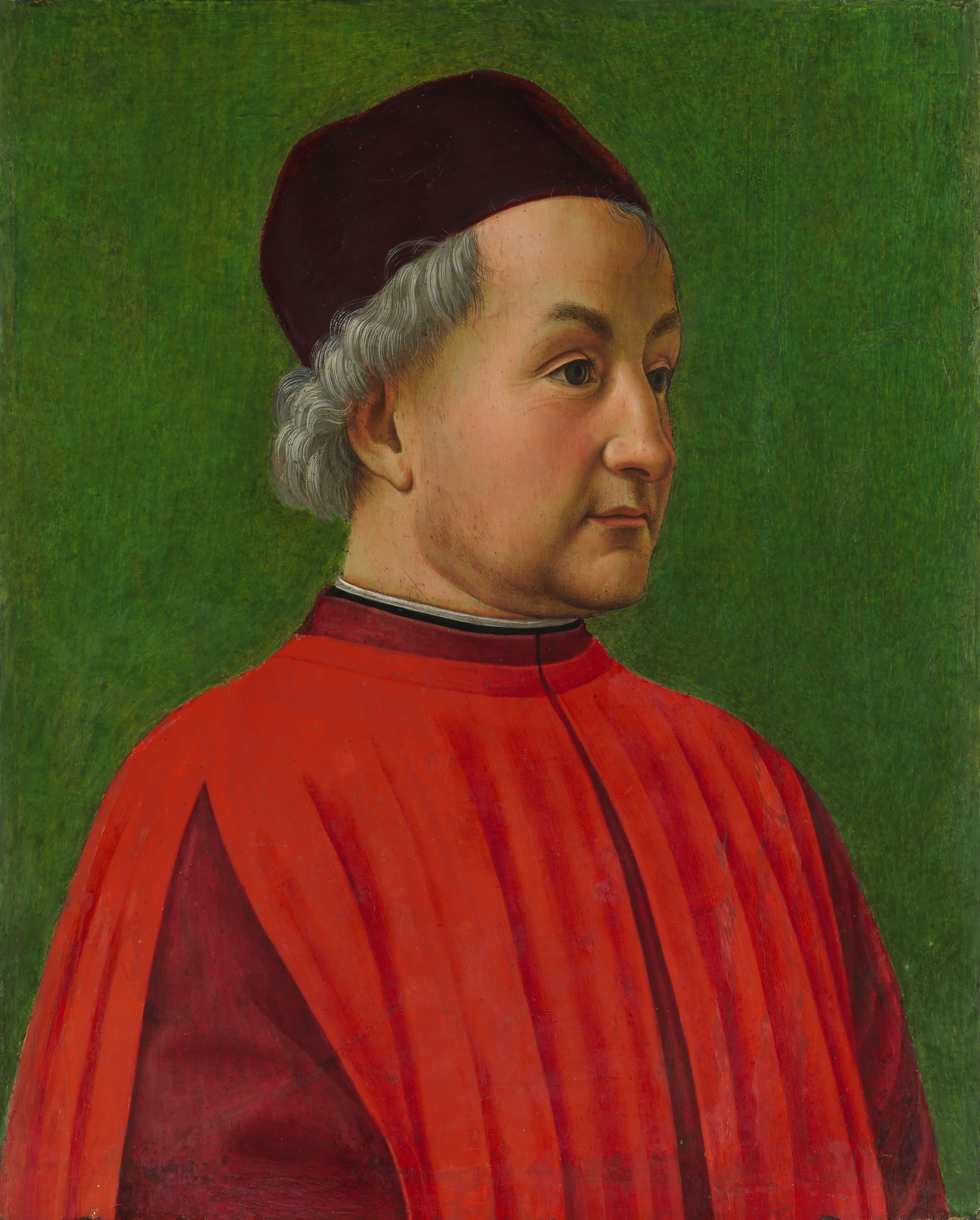
- Artist: Domenico Ghirlandaio
- Year: c. 1478
- Medium: Tempera on wood
- Dimensions: 54.6 cm × 44.5 cm (21.5 in × 17.5 in)
- Location: Metropolitan Museum of Arts, New York City
- Owner: Metropolitan Museum of Arts

Portrait of a Man is a c. 1478 painting by the Italian Renaissance painter Domenico Ghirlandaio (1449–1494) executed in tempera on wood.

== Painting ==
Domenico Ghirlandaio was an Italian Renaissance painter who was active in Florence. He was a representative of the Florentine Renaissance, along with Verrocchio, the Pollaiolo brothers and Sandro Botticelli.

The painting is an early work of the painter, probably painted at the same time when he painted the frescos in the Collegiate Church of San Gimignano. Ghirlandaio was noted for capturing the facial expression of his sitters in a remarkable way, rendering them with animated expressions. The painting was cleaned and renovated, revealing the bright green background underneath a layer of oxidised pigment. The identity of the man depicted in the painting is unknown.

In 15th-century Italy, the stylistic development of individual portrait-painting had awoken with new vigor after a thousand years of silence. The last period in the history was in the antiquity, when the Romans were known for their prolific depiction of individual traits of peoples. After the Romans this was mostly reserved for rulers and notable members of the aristocracy and historic figures. The new kind of depictions from the Renaissance were based on the emerging sense of individuality, the visual sense of self-understanding; a new kind of self-presentation that in our modern era is taken for granted.

The painting remained in Italy until 1829, when it was acquired by the Königliche Museen zu Berlin (later the Kaiser Friedrich Museum, now part of the Berlin State Museums). Originally attributed to Ghirlandaio, it was re-attributed to his brother-in-law and artistic follower Sebastiano Mainardi and sold in 1924. After passing through the hands of several dealers, it was acquired in New York by art collector Michael Friedsam who bequeathed it to the Metropolitan Museum of Arts in 1931.

== See also ==
- Davide Ghirlandaio
- Benedetto Ghirlandaio
