= Ghirlandaio =

Ghirlandaio (pronounced [ɡirlanˈdaːjo]) is the surname of a family of Renaissance Italian painters:

- Domenico Ghirlandaio (1449–1494), painter of fresco cycles and Michelangelo's teacher
- Davide Ghirlandaio (1452–1525), younger brother of Domenico
- Benedetto Ghirlandaio (1458–1497), younger brother of Domenico and Davide
- Ridolfo Ghirlandaio (1483–1561), son of Domenico

== See also ==
- Michele Tosini (1503–1577), Italian painter, also known as Michele del Ghirlandaio, apprentice of Ridolfo
