= Ana Maria Pacheco =

Brazilian sculptor, painter, and printmaker

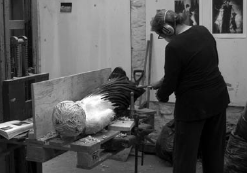
- Pacheco working on a polychrome sculpture
- Born: 1943 (age 82–83); Goiânia, Brazil
- Known for: Sculpture, Painting, Printmaking

Ana Maria Pacheco (born 1943) is a Brazilian sculptor, painter, and printmaker. Her work is influenced by her Brazilian heritage and often focuses on supernatural themes, incorporating them into unfolding narratives within her work. Pacheco's work has been displayed in galleries internationally and has won multiple awards throughout her career.

== Life ==
Pacheco was born in Goiás, Brazil in 1943. While living in Brazil, she studied sculpture and music from Pontifical Catholic University of Goiás and the Federal University of Goiás. She subsequently completed a postgraduate course in music and education at the Federal University of Brazil in Rio de Janeiro. She later taught and lectured at these institutions before she moving to London in 1973 to study at the Slade School of Art on a British Council Scholarship. Between 1985 and 1989, Pacheco was the first woman head of fine art at the Norwich School of Art. She received the Ordem de Rio Branco from the Brazilian government in 1999. In 2002, she was made an honorary Doctor of Philosophy by The Senate of East Anglia University in partnership with the Norwich School of Art. She was made a Fellow of University College London in 2003.

== Career ==
Pacheco's work commonly focuses on travel, often with themes exploring fantasy and the supernatural. Regular examples include Brazilian legends, Mythology, Christian mysticism, and Medieval satire. Her artworks depict narratives that are discovered by the viewer through their experience of looking, specifically playing on their curiosity to arouse their interest and imagination. Her work is also a reflection on humanity, explaining that her "art shows us how vulnerable we are ". She claims that her biggest influence is O Aleijadinho.

Pacheco is best known for her multi-figure groups of polychrome sculptures carved from wood. These are typically exhibited as installation pieces and include Man and his Sheep (Birmingham Museum and Art Gallery) and Dark Night of the Soul (1999), created during her residency at the National Gallery, London as a response to The Martyrdom of Saint Sebastian by the Pollaiuolo brothers.

Pacheco (with a team of two helpers) produced a large figure in yellow limestone for the Stoke-on-Trent National Garden Festival of 1986.

Pacheco was the first sculptor Associate Artist at the National Gallery in London between 1997 and 2000. The exhibition Ana Maria Pacheco: New Painting and Sculpture toured the UK after display at the National Gallery from 29 September 1999 to 9 January 2000.

In 2015 Pacheco's work was displayed in four simultaneous exhibitions across venues in Norwich. The exhibitions were curated by Keith Roberts for the Norfolk Contemporary Art Society in association with Pratt Contemporary. The exhibitions were displayed at The GALLERY, Norwich University of the Arts, Norwich Cathedral, Norwich Castle Museum & Art Gallery, and The Cathedral of St John the Baptist. On discussing the exhibitions, Roberts said "Ana’s art encompasses large and enduring themes; violence, journeys, death, love, transformation and metamorphosis reflect her high seriousness, but at the same time her work is neither pompous nor devoid of humour."

Dispersing the Night was an exhibition at Salisbury Cathedral curated by Jacquiline Creswell in association with Pratt Contemporary which included Pacheco's work. The exhibition opened on 23 July 2017. It was at this exhibition that Pacheco's work Be Aware was first publicly displayed. On the exhibition, Creswell said: '"The theme of the exhibition is hope, an optimistic attitude, and a firm belief in the positive side of human nature along with its power to drive the darkness from our lives.... Ana Maria’s work makes us aware of our vulnerability as well as illuminating our humanity. It allows us to reflect on the way we frail, brave humans deal with our journey of life, its many contradictions and dimensions of reality – the imperfectability of existence."'

== Exhibitions ==
- Ikon Gallery, Birmingham (1983)
- Artsite Gallery and St John's Catholic Church, Bath - Sculpture, Painting, Drawing and Prints. Exhibition toured on to Cornerhouse, Manchester; Wolverhampton Art Gallery; Worcester City Art Gallery; Worcester Cathedral; Metropole Arts Centre, Folkestone; Milton Keynes Exhibition Gallery; Glasgow Print Studio Gallery (1989)
- Some Exercise of Power, Museum of Modern Art, Oxford. Touring on to the Camden Arts Centre, London (1991)
- Trondhjems Kunstforening, Trondheim, Norway (1992)
- Trilogy: Sculpture and Prints, Winchester Cathedral (1992)
- Oslo Kunstforening, Norway (1993)
- Norwich Castle Museum, Norfolk (1994)
- The Gas Hall, Birmingham Museum and Art Gallery (1994)
- Ormeau Baths Gallery, Belfast, Northern Ireland (1995)
- Cass Sculpture Foundation, Chichester (1995)
- The Trout Gallery, Weiss Center for the Arts at Dickinson College, Pennsylvania, USA (1996)
- The Old Jail Arts Center, Albany, Texas, USA (1997)
- Kilkenny Arts Festival, Ireland (1999)
- National Gallery, London. Exhibition toured on to Wolverhampton Art Gallery, Glynn Vivian Art Gallery, Swansea; Whitworth Art Gallery, Manchester; Mappin Art Gallery, Sheffield (1999)
- Ashmolean Museum, Oxford (2001)
- Dark Night of the Soul, Salander-O'Reilly Galleries, New York City (2002)
- Land of No Return, Salander-O'Reilly Galleries, New York City (2003)
- Brighton Museum & Art Gallery (2004)
- Hayward Touring: A touring exhibition organised by the Hayward Gallery for Arts Council England (2004- 2010)
- Danforth Museum of Art, Framingham, MA, USA (2007)
- Aldeburgh Festival of Music and the Arts (2008)
- Wallspace at All Hallows on the Wall, London (2008)
- St John's Church, Waterloo (2010)
- Studio 3 Gallery, University of Kent at Canterbury (2011)
- The Longest Journey at Salisbury Cathedral (North Transept), Salisbury International Arts Festival (2012)
- Pinacoteca do Estado de São Paulo, Brazil (2012-2013)
- Edinburgh Arts Festival, St Albert's Catholic Chaplaincy (2013)
- Shadows of the Wanderer; Cathedral of St John the Baptist - Studies of Heads (John the Baptist I & III), The Gallery at Norwich University of the Arts; Norwich Cathedral (North Transept) (2015)
- Enchanted Garden, Norwich Castle Museum (2015-2017)
- Shadows of the Wanderer, Chichester Cathedral (2016)
- Dispersing the Night, Salisbury Cathedral (2017)
- Galway International Arts Festival, Ireland (2017)

== Awards and appointments ==
- First Prize, Goiás Biennale. Selected to represent Brazil at the São Paulo Biennale, 1970
- British Council Scholarship to the Slade School of Fine Art, London, 1973
- Head of Fine Art, Norwich School of Art, Norfolk, 1985-89
- Invited to Burgdorfer Bildhauer-Symposion, Switzerland - The Human Image of Today, 1986
- Appointed fourth Associate Artist, National Gallery London, 1997-2000
- Ordem do Rio Branco from the Brazilian Government, 1999
- Honorary Doctorate, University of East Anglia, 2002
- Honorary Doctorate, Norwich University of the Arts, 2002
- Fellow of University College London, 2003
- Comenda do Anhanguera from the State of Goiás, Brazil, 2012
- Mário Pedrosa Award for Contemporary Artist from the Brazilian Association of Art Critics, 2015
