= Visitation (Ghirlandaio) =

Painting by the Italian Renaissance painter Domenico Ghirlandaio

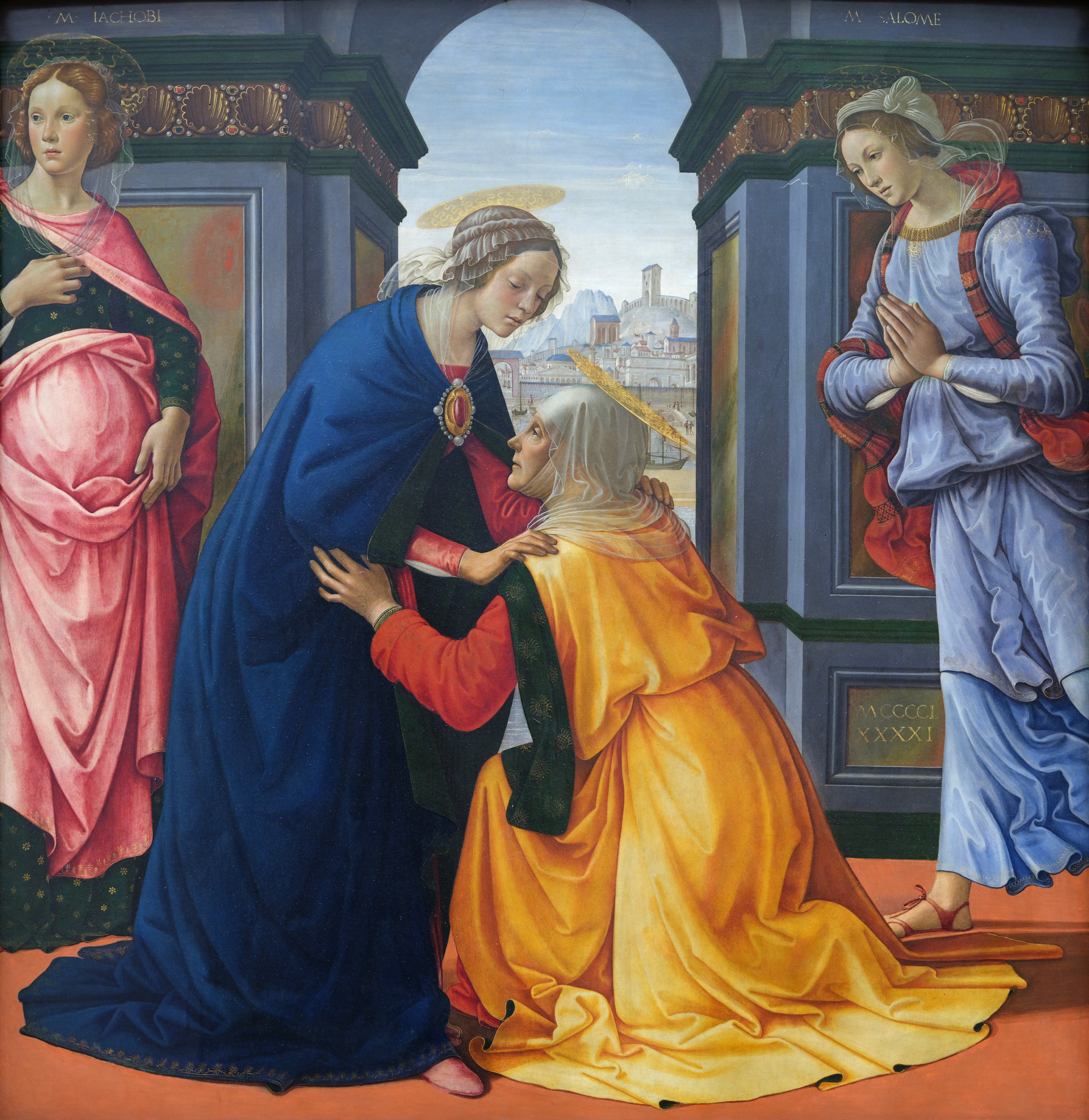
- Artist: Domenico Ghirlandaio
- Year: 1491
- Medium: Tempera on panel
- Dimensions: 172 cm × 165 cm (68 in × 65 in)
- Location: Louvre Museum, Paris

The Visitation is a painting by the Italian Renaissance painter Domenico Ghirlandaio, dating from 1491. It now is in the Louvre Museum, Paris, France.

The work was commissioned by Lorenzo Tornabuoni for the church later known as Santa Maria Maddalena de' Pazzi.

== Description ==
The Visitation refers to the meeting between St. Mary and St. Elizabeth described in the Gospel of Luke, Luke 1:39–56. The subject was set by Ghirlandaio with a large classical arch in the background featuring a landscape in the centre. Elizabeth, wearing a wide yellow vest, is paying homage to Mary and kneeling.

The painting features numerous details, including the refraction effects of the light, which Ghirlandaio studied from Flemish paintings at Florence. Others include: the frieze decorated with pearls and shells (allusions to Mary's purity), the light veil of the Madonna, the gilt brooch decorated with pearls and a ruby in the centre (this a hint to Jesus’ future Passion) which holds her cloak. The Gabinetto dei Disegni e delle Stampe of the Uffizi houses a preparatory drawing of Mary's cloak.

The two women at the sides are, as described by the inscriptions on the arch, Mary, mother of James, and Mary Salome. In the Medieval context, the two were thought to be daughters of St. Anne and thus the sisters or half-sisters of Mary. In the Gospel narrative, they are not present at the Visitation; but in some interpretations of the crucifixion narrative, they are said to have been present at the foot of the cross, and their inclusion in the painting may be intended as a reference to the crucifixion. Salome's dress is a citation of Filippo Lippi's Bartolini Tondo, which was the inspiration for numerous similarly graceful figures in works by Ghirlandaio, Botticelli and others.

Stylistic differences in the figures testifies the work of workshop assistants, perhaps Sebastiano Mainardi. On the lower right of the arch is the date MCCCCLXXXXI (1491). The city in the misty background could be a re-elaboration of Rome, as it includes a triumphal arch and the Pantheon.

== Sources ==
- Micheletti, Emma; Ghirlandaio, Domenico (2004). Pittori del Rinascimento. Florence: Scala. ISBN 88-8117-099-X.
- Quermann, Andreas (1998). Ghirlandaio. Cologne: Könemann.
