= Domenico Ghirlandaio =

Italian Renaissance painter from Florence (1448–1494)

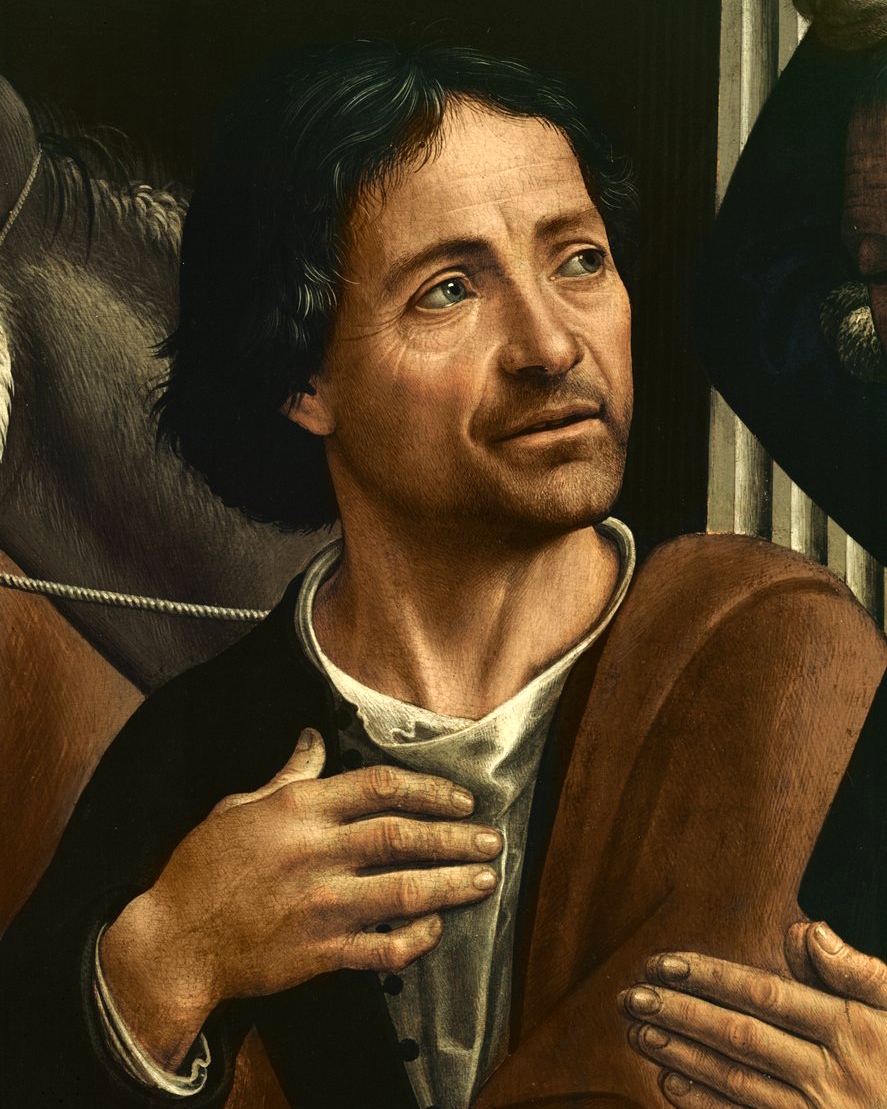
- Detail from Adoration of the Shepherds, 1485
- Born: Domenico di Tommaso Curradi di Doffo Bigordi; 2 June 1448; Florence, Republic of Florence
- Died: 11 January 1494 (aged 45); Florence, Republic of Florence
- Resting place: Basilica of Santa Maria Novella
- Known for: Painter
- Notable work: Paintings in: Church of Ognissanti, Palazzo Vecchio, Santa Trinita, Tornabuoni Chapel in Florence and Sistine Chapel, Rome
- Movement: Italian Renaissance

Domenico di Tommaso Curradi di Doffo Bigordi (2 June 1448 – 11 January 1494), professionally known as Domenico Ghirlandaio (also spelt as Ghirlandajo), (Note: UK: /ˌɡɪərlænˈdaɪoʊ/ GHEER-lan-DY-oh, US: /ˌɡɪərlənˈdaɪoʊ, ˌɡɪərlənˈdɑːjoʊ/ GHEER-lən-DY-oh, GHEER-lən-DAH-yoh; Italian: [doˈmeːniko ɡirlanˈdaːjo].) was an Italian Renaissance painter born in Florence. Ghirlandaio was part of the so-called "third generation" of the Florentine Renaissance, along with Verrocchio, the Pollaiolo brothers and Sandro Botticelli.

Ghirlandaio led a large and efficient workshop that included his brothers Davide Ghirlandaio and Benedetto Ghirlandaio, his brother-in-law Bastiano Mainardi from San Gimignano, and later his son Ridolfo Ghirlandaio. Many apprentices passed through Ghirlandaio's workshop, including Michelangelo.

His particular talent lay in his ability to posit depictions of contemporary life and portraits of contemporary people within the context of religious narratives, bringing him great popularity and many large commissions.

== Life and works ==
=== Early years ===
Ghirlandaio was born Domenico di Tommaso di Currado di Doffo Bigordi. He was the eldest of six children born to Tommaso Bigordi by his first wife Antonia di ser Paolo Paoli; of these, only Domenico and his brothers and collaborators Davide and Benedetto Ghirlandaio survived childhood. Tommaso had two more children by his second wife, also named Antonia, whom he married in 1464. Domenico's half-sister Alessandra (b. 1475) married the painter Bastiano Mainardi in 1494. Both Ghirlandaio's father and his uncle, Antonio, were setaiuolo a minuto (dealers of silks and related objects in small quantities).

Giorgio Vasari reported that Domenico was at first apprenticed to his father, who was a goldsmith. The nickname "Il Ghirlandaio" (garland-maker) came to Domenico from his father, who was famed for creating the metallic garland-like headdresses worn by Florentine women. According to Vasari, Domenico made portraits of the passers-by and visitors to the shop: "when he painted the country people or anyone who passed through his studio he immediately captured their likeness". He was eventually apprenticed to Alesso Baldovinetti to study painting and mosaic. According to the art historian Günter Passavent, he was apprenticed in Florence to Andrea del Verrocchio. He maintained a close association with other Florentine painters including Botticelli and with the Umbrian painter Perugino.

=== First works in Florence, Rome, and Tuscany ===
Ghirlandaio excelled in the painting of frescos and it is for his fresco cycles that he is best known. An early commission came to him in the 1470s from the Commune of San Gimignano to decorate the Chapel of Santa Fina in the Collegiate Church of that city. The frescos, executed from 1477 to 1478, depict two miraculous events associated with the death of Saint Fina.

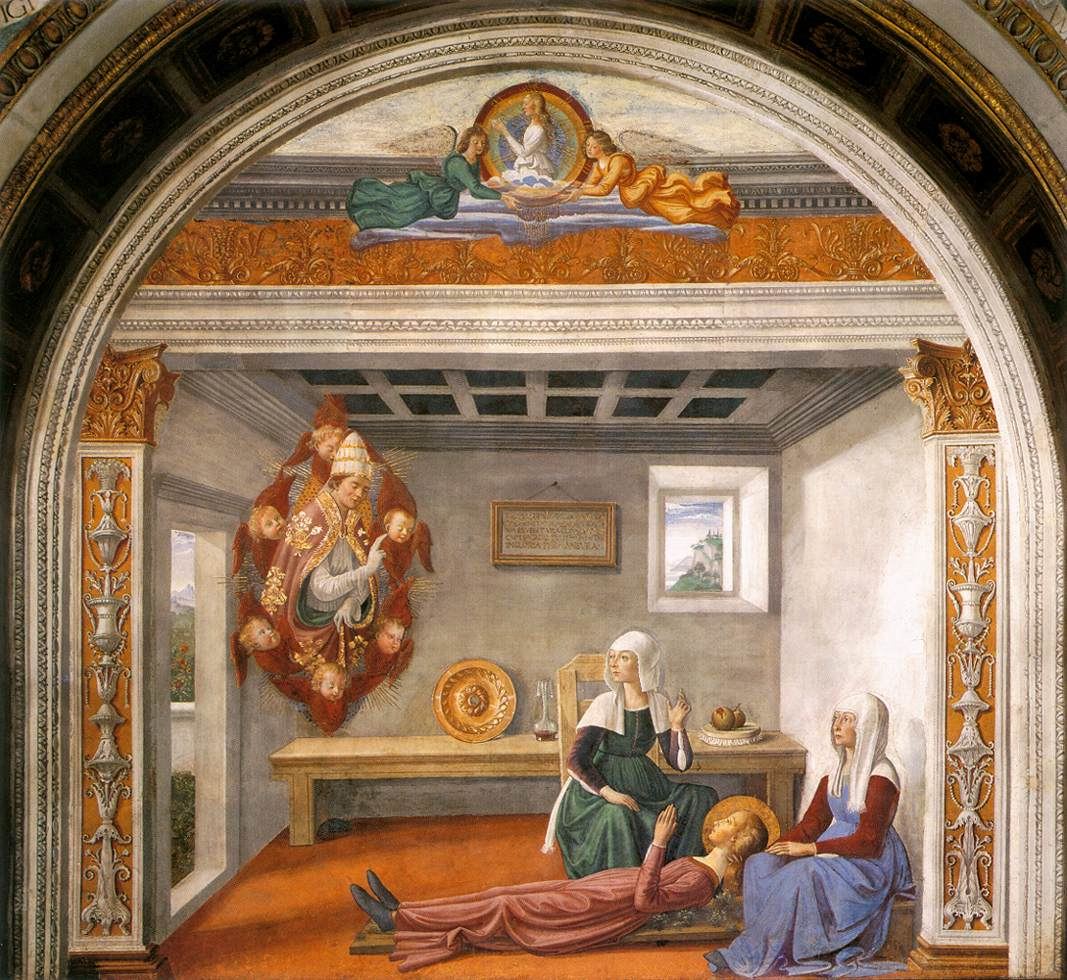
Pope Gregory announces the death of Santa Fina, in the Collegiate Church of San Gimignano (about 1477)

In 1480, Ghirlandaio painted St. Jerome in His Study as a companion piece to Botticelli's Saint Augustine in His Study in the Church of Ognissanti, Florence. He also painted a life-sized Last Supper in its refectory. From 1481 to 1485, he was employed on frescoes at the Palazzo Vecchio, painting among other works an Apotheosis of St. Zenobius (1482) in the Sala del Giglio, an over-life-sized work with an elaborate architectural framework, figures of Roman heroes, and other secular details, striking in its perspective and compositional skill.

In 1481, Ghirlandaio was summoned to Rome by Pope Sixtus IV as one of a team of Florentine and Umbrian painters who he commissioned to create a series of frescos depicting popes and scenes from the Old and New Testaments on the walls of the Sistine Chapel. Ghirlandaio painted the Vocation of the Apostles. He also painted the now lost Resurrection of Christ. The Crossing of the Red Sea has also been attributed to him, but is consistent with the style of Cosimo Roselli who was also part of the commission. Ghirlandaio is known to have created other works in Rome, now lost. His future brother-in-law, Sebastiano Mainardi, assisted him with these commissions and in the early frescoes at San Gimignano where Mainardi is now thought to have painted an Annunciation sometimes attributed to Ghirlandaio.

In 1484, an agent of Ludovico il Moro wrote to his lord, describing the works of artists whose works he had seen in Florence: "Domenico Ghirlandaio [is] a good painter on panel and better in mural fresco; his style is very good; he is active and very creative."

=== Later works in Tuscany ===
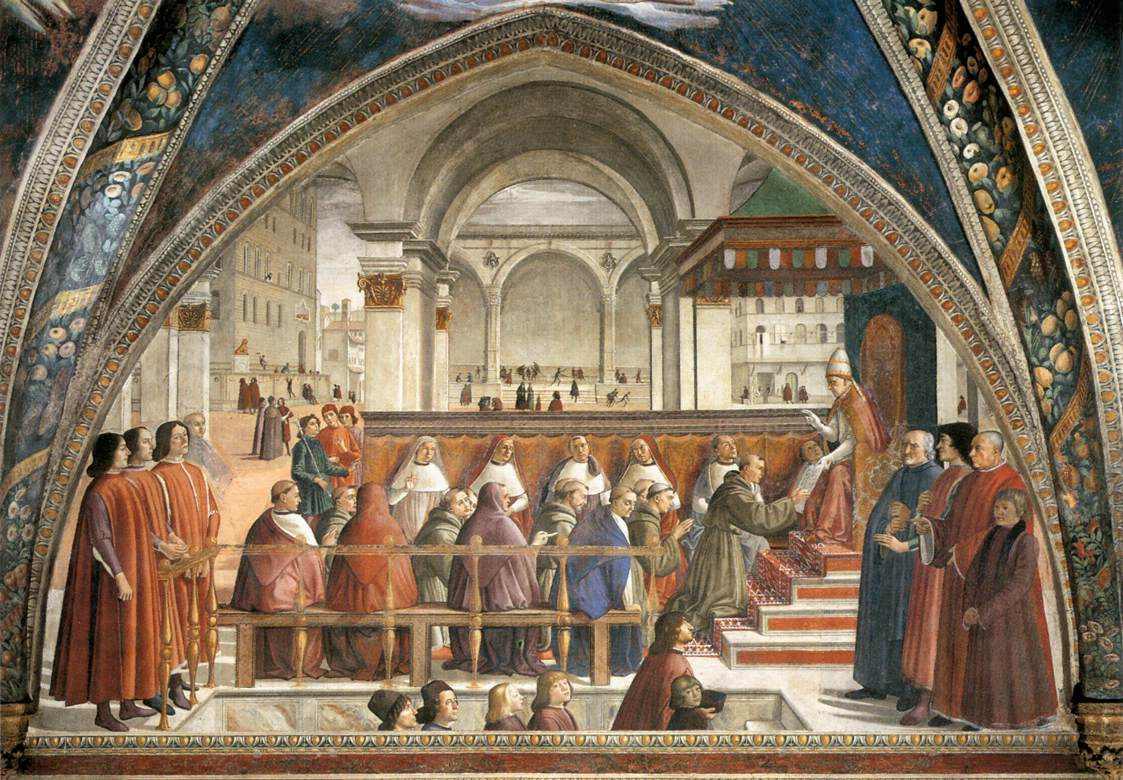
The Confirmation of the Franciscan Rule from the Sassetti Chapel, with portraits of Lorenzo de' Medici and his family occupying prominent positions as spectators to the event

Between 1482 and 1485, Ghirlandaio painted a fresco cycle in the Sassetti Chapel of Santa Trinita for the banker Francesco Sassetti, the powerful director of the Medici bank, whose Rome branch was headed by Giovanni Tornabuoni, Ghirlandaio's future patron. The cycle was of six scenes from the life of Saint Francis of Assisi, including Saint Francis obtaining from Pope Honorius the Approval of the Rules of His Order, the saint's Death and Obsequies and a Resuscitation of a child of the Spini family, who had died as a result of a fall from a window. The first of these paintings contains portraits of Lorenzo de' Medici, Sassetti and Lorenzo's children with their tutor, Agnolo Poliziano. The Resuscitation shows the painter's own likeness.

In 1483, there arrived in Florence a masterpiece of the Flemish painter Hugo van der Goes. Now known as the Portinari Altarpiece, it was an Adoration of the Shepherds, commissioned by Tommaso Portinari, an employee of the Medici Bank. The painting was in oil paint, not the tempera employed in Florence, and demonstrated the flexibility of that medium in the painting of textures and intensity of light and shade. The aspect of the painting that had a profound effect on Ghirlandaio was the naturalism with which the shepherds were depicted.

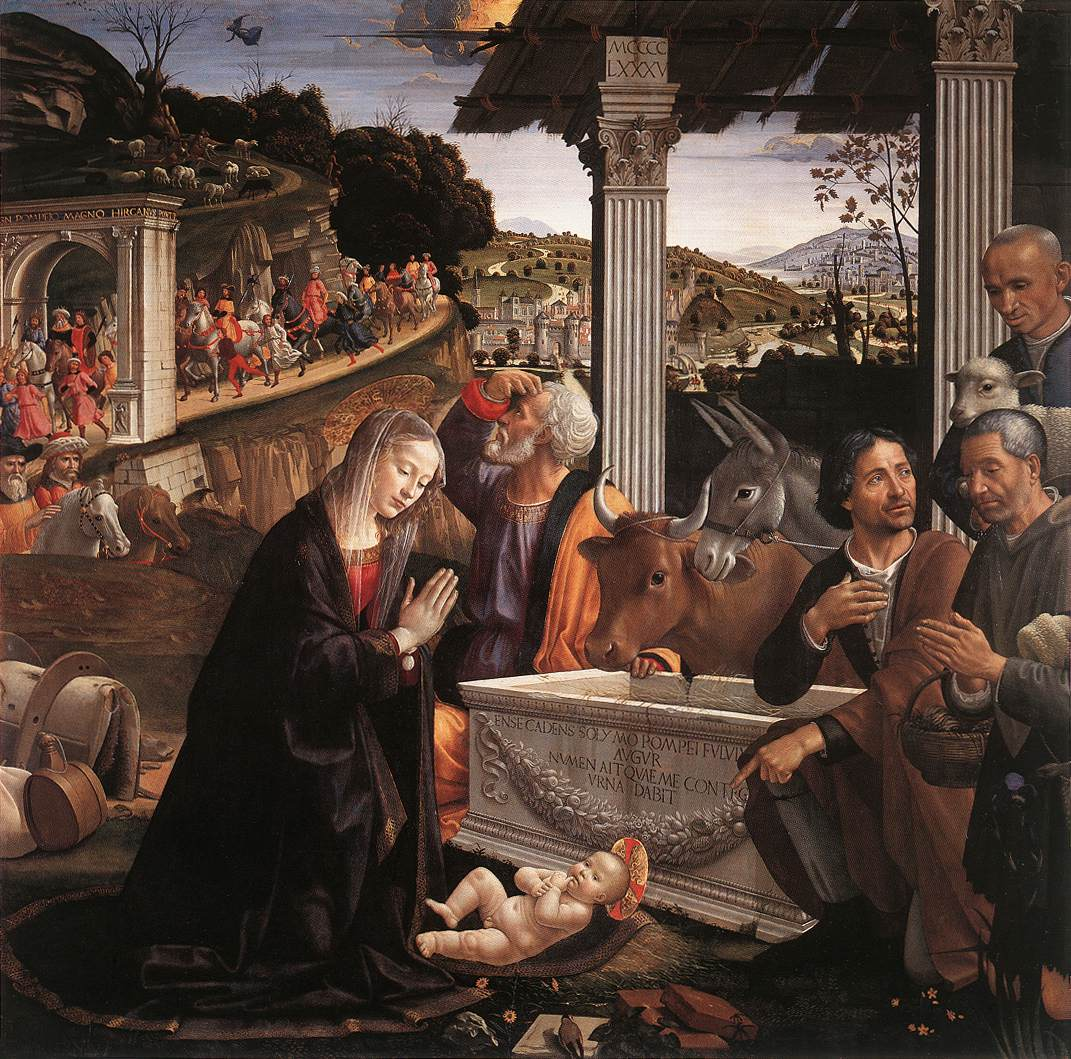
The Adoration of the Shepherds, Sassetti Chapel, containing a portrait of Ghirlandaio as one of the Shepherds

Ghirlandaio painted the altarpiece of the Sassetti chapel, an Adoration of the Shepherds, in 1485. It is in this painting that he particularly shows his indebtedness to the Portinari Altarpiece. The shepherds, among whom is a self-portrait of the artist, are portrayed with a realism that was an advance in Florentine painting at that time. The altarpiece is still in position in Santa Trinita, surrounded by the six frescoes depicting the Life of St. Francis of which it became the centrepiece. On either side are portraits of the kneeling donors, and although the figures are in fresco on the wall, they occupy the same position and relationship to the central scene of the Adoration that the donors do on the outer panels of the Portinari triptych.

Immediately after the commission for the Sassetti Chapel, Ghirlandaio was asked to renew the frescoes in the choir of the Santa Maria Novella, which formed the chapel of the Ricci family. The Tornabuoni and Tornaquinci families, who were much more prominent than the Ricci, undertook the cost of the restoration, with certain contractual conditions. (Note: According to Vasari the question of preserving the arms of the Ricci gave rise to litigation.) The Tornabuoni Chapel frescoes were painted in four courses around the three walls between 1485 and 1490, the subjects being the lives of the Virgin Mary and St. John the Baptist.

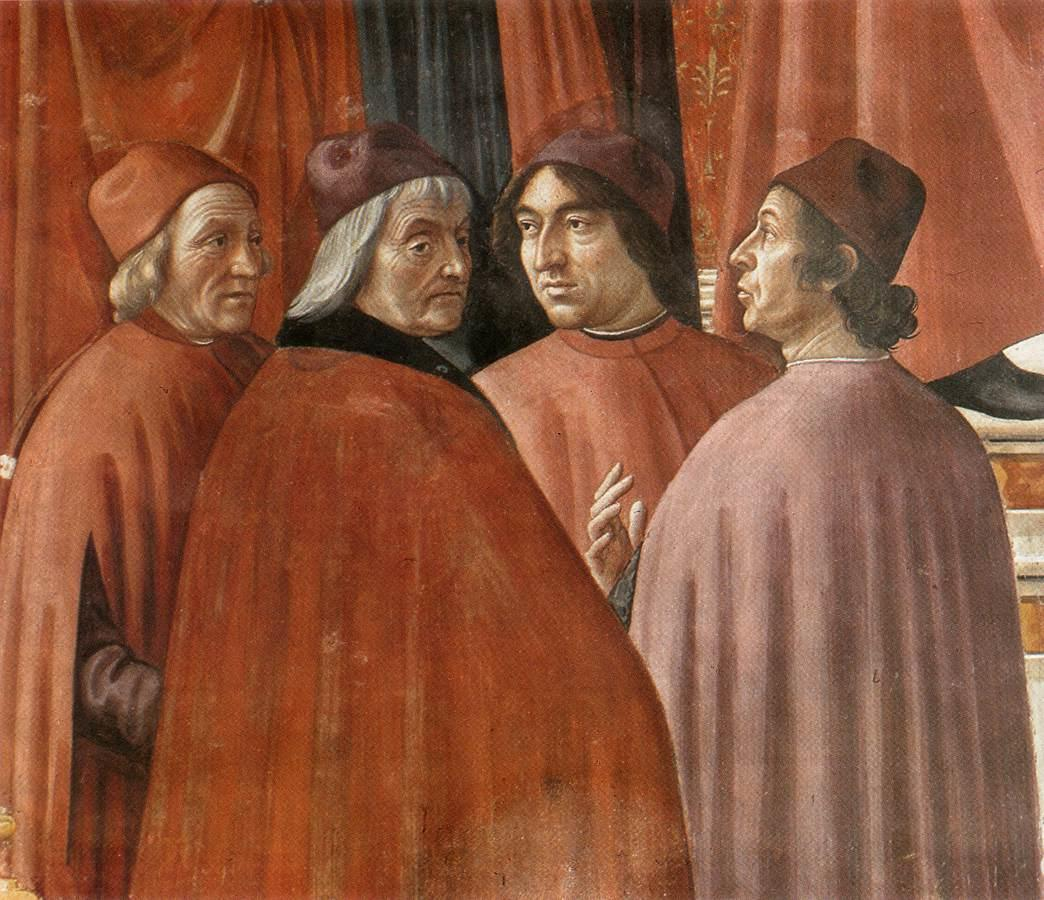
Detail of the Angel appearing to Zacharias showing portraits of the philosophers Marsilio Ficino, Cristoforo Landino, Angelo Poliziano and Demetrios Chalkondyles

In this cycle, there are no fewer than twenty-one portraits of the Tornabuoni and Tornaquinci families. In the Angel appearing to Zacharias, there are portraits of members of the Medici Academy: Agnolo Poliziano, Marsilio Ficino and others. The Tornabuoni Chapel was completed in 1490 with the altarpiece probably executed with the assistance of Domenico's brothers, Davide and Benedetto; and a stained glass window to Ghirlandaio's own design. Domenico painted an altarpiece for Giovanni Tornabuoni to commemorate his first wife who had died in childbirth, as had Giovanni's mother. The Virgin with the Two Marys is now in the Louvre. It is the only time that the two Marys are seen without Mary Magdalen. They usually are depicted together as the Three Marys. However, Mary Magdalene was never pregnant so was not a fitting subject for this altarpiece.

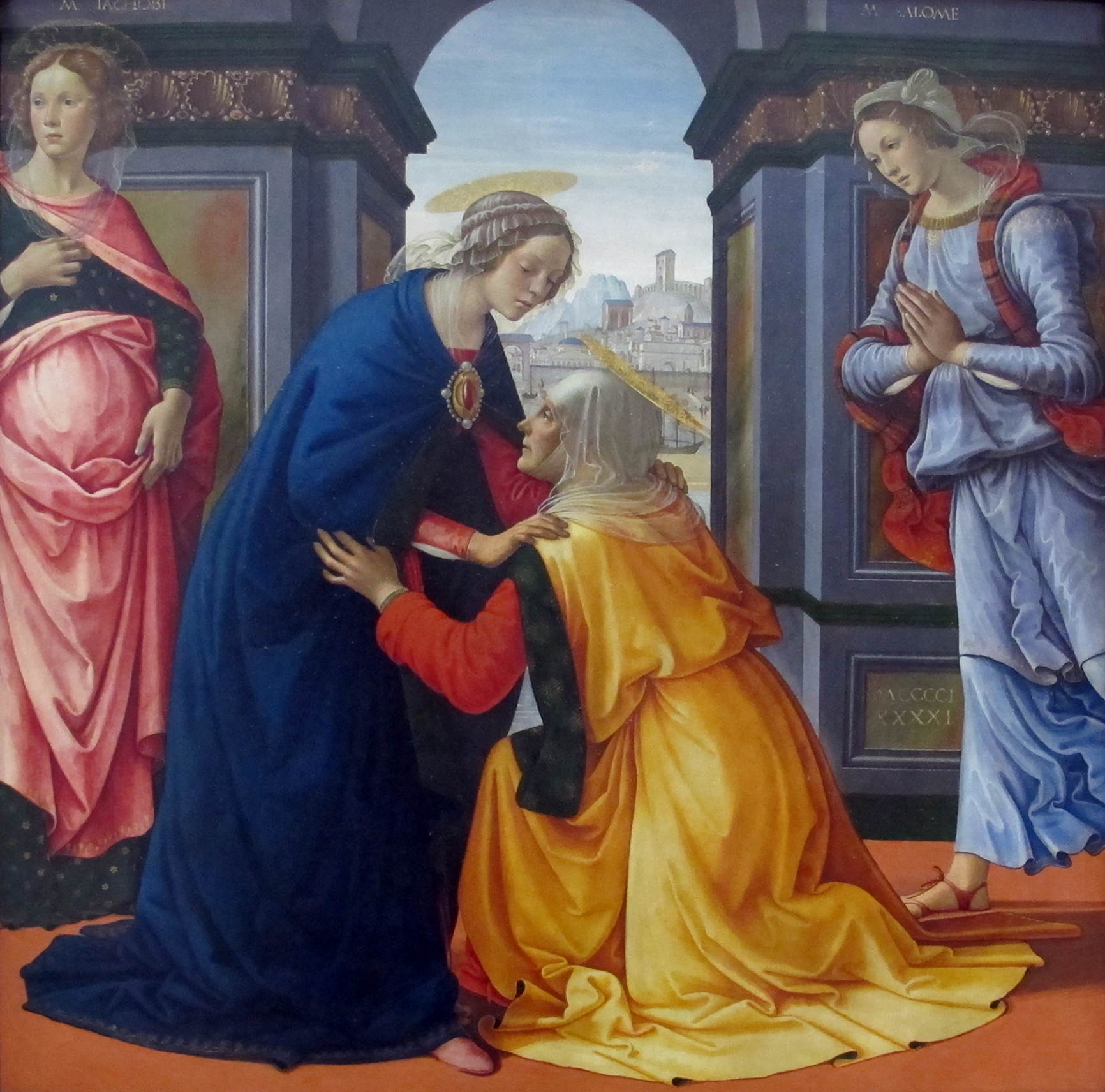
Visitation, c. 1491

Although mainly known for his fresco cycles Ghirlandaio painted a number of altarpieces including the Virgin Adored by Saints Zenobius, Justus and Others, painted for the church of Saint Justus, now in the Uffizi Gallery and the Adoration of the Magi in the Florentine orphanage, the Ospedale degli Innocenti, in which he included a self-portrait. Other panel paintings include Christ in Glory with Romuald and Other Saints, in the Badia of Volterra and the Visitation now in the Louvre, which bears the last ascertained date (1491) of all his works. Ghirlandaio painted a number of panel portraits of known identities, such as his profile portrait of Giovanna Tornabuoni, commissioned in 1488. Perhaps his best known is the Portrait of an Old Man and his Grandson, remarkable for both the tenderness of expression and the realism with which the disfigured nose (rhinophyma) of the old man is depicted. According to Vasari, Ghirlandaio also painted several scenes of Classical subjects with nude figures, including a Vulcan and his Assistants forging Thunderbolts, for Lorenzo II de' Medici, but which no longer exists. He also produced designs for a number of mosaics including the Annunciation, on a portal of the Florence Cathedral.

=== Death ===
Ghirlandaio died on 11 January 1494 of "pestilential fever" and was buried in Santa Maria Novella. The day and month of his birth remain undocumented, but he is recorded as having died in early January of his forty-fifth year. He had been married twice and left six children. One of his three sons, Ridolfo Ghirlandaio, also became a painter. Although he had a long line of descendants, the family name died out in the seventeenth century, when its last members entered monasteries.

== Critical assessment and legacy ==
Ghirlandaio worked mainly in fresco, with a number of important works being executed in tempera. Vasari states that Ghirlandaio was the first to abandon, in great part, the use of gilding in his pictures, representing by painting any objects that were made of gold. This is not applicable to his entire oeuvre, as details in some paintings, for example, the altarpiece of the Adoration of the Shepherds (now in Florence Academy) were rendered in gold leaf.

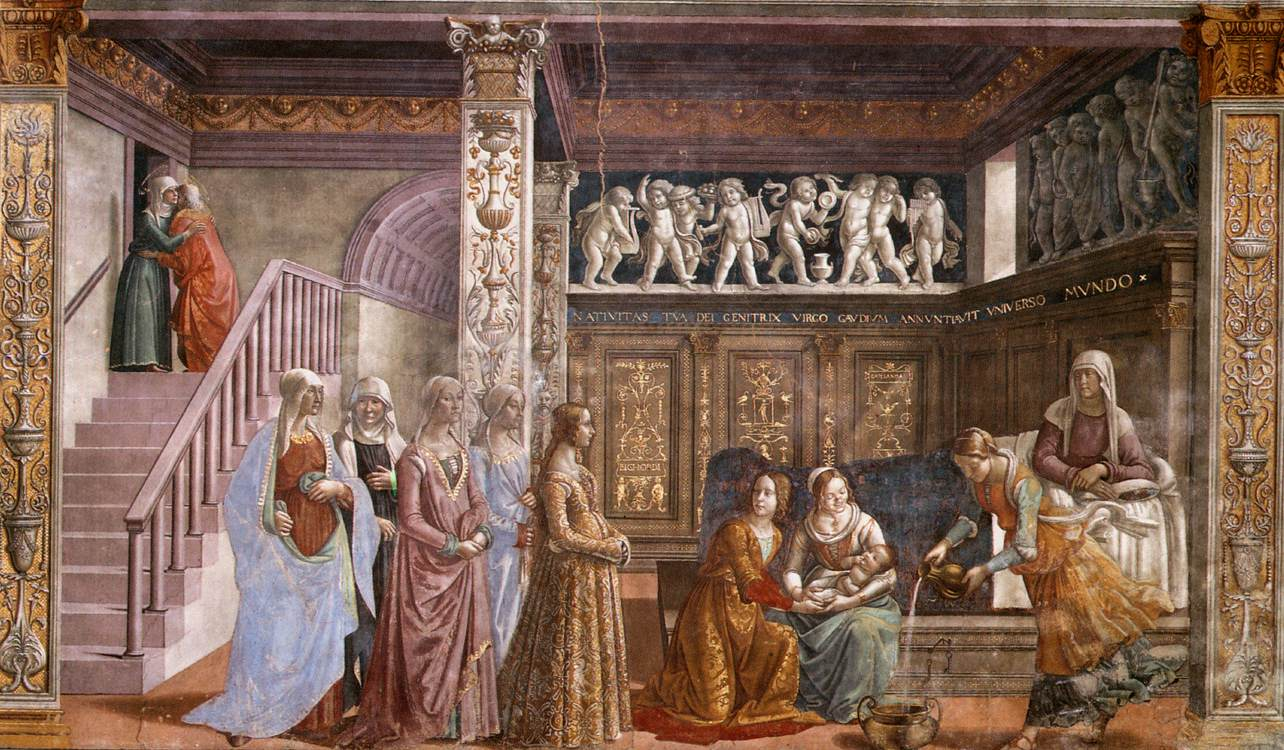
The Birth of Mary, Tornabuoni Chapel (1485–90), appears to represent a domestic scene from the life of contemporary Florentine nobility

According to William Michael Rossetti, "[Ghirlandaio's] scheme of composition is grand and decorous; his chiaroscuro excellent, and especially his perspectives, which he would design on a very elaborate scale by the eye alone; his colour is more open to criticism, but this remark applies much less to the frescoes than the tempera-pictures, which are sometimes too broadly and crudely bright." According to Vasari, his sense of perspective was so acute that he made drawings of ancient Roman monuments such as the Colisseum in which he worked entirely by eye, that later proved to have mathematically accurate proportion and linear perspective when measured.

Ghirlandaio is credited as the teacher of Michelangelo. Francesco Granacci is another among his pupils. According to Vasari, these two were sent by Ghirlandaio to the Medici Academy, when Lorenzo de' Medici requested his two best pupils. Although Michelangelo regarded himself as primarily a sculptor, in the sixteenth century he was to follow his master as a painter of frescos, at the Sistine Chapel.

Ghirlandaio was highly praised by Vasari: "[Ghirlandaio] who, from his talent and from the greatness and the vast number of his works, may be called one of the most important and most excellent masters of the age..." In the nineteenth century Jacob Burckhardt and others praised him for his compositions, for his technical ability, and for the lifelike quality of his figures, seen by Archibald Joseph Crowe and Giovanni Battista Cavalcaselle as being as innovative as those of Giotto had been. By the late nineteenth century the appreciation of his work had waned and it was not until 1994, the five-hundredth anniversary of the artist's death, that interest in him was rekindled. (Note: Rosenauer's article erroneously states 1994 as the anniversary of the artist's birth rather than death.) At this time a symposium was held and subsequently in-depth monographs on the artist were published. Rosenauer comments on the usefulness of Ghirlandaio's paintings as pictorial records for the historian.

== Works by Ghirlandaio ==
=== Portraits ===
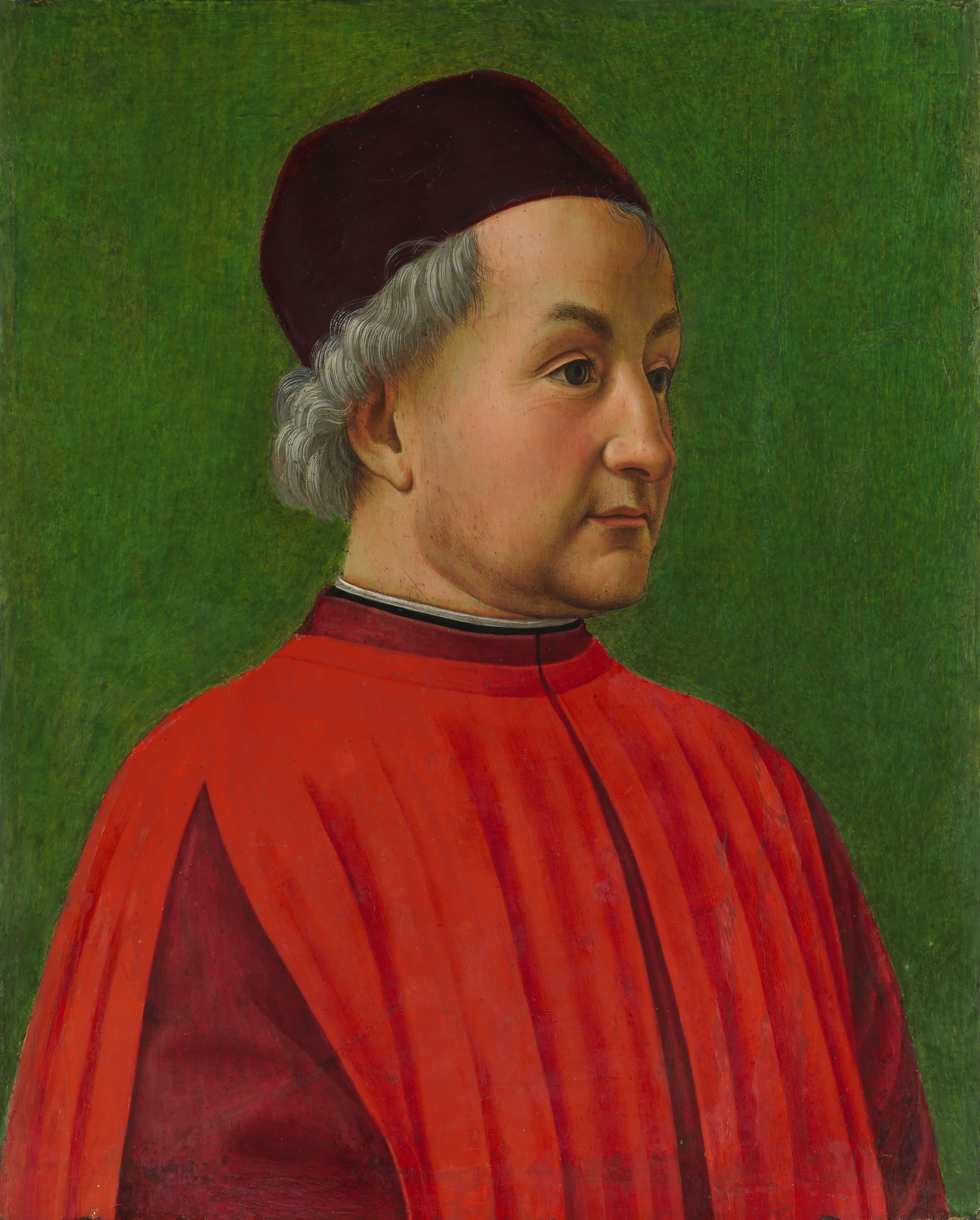
Portrait of a Man, possibly Marsilio Ficino, (c. 1477) Metropolitan Museum of Art

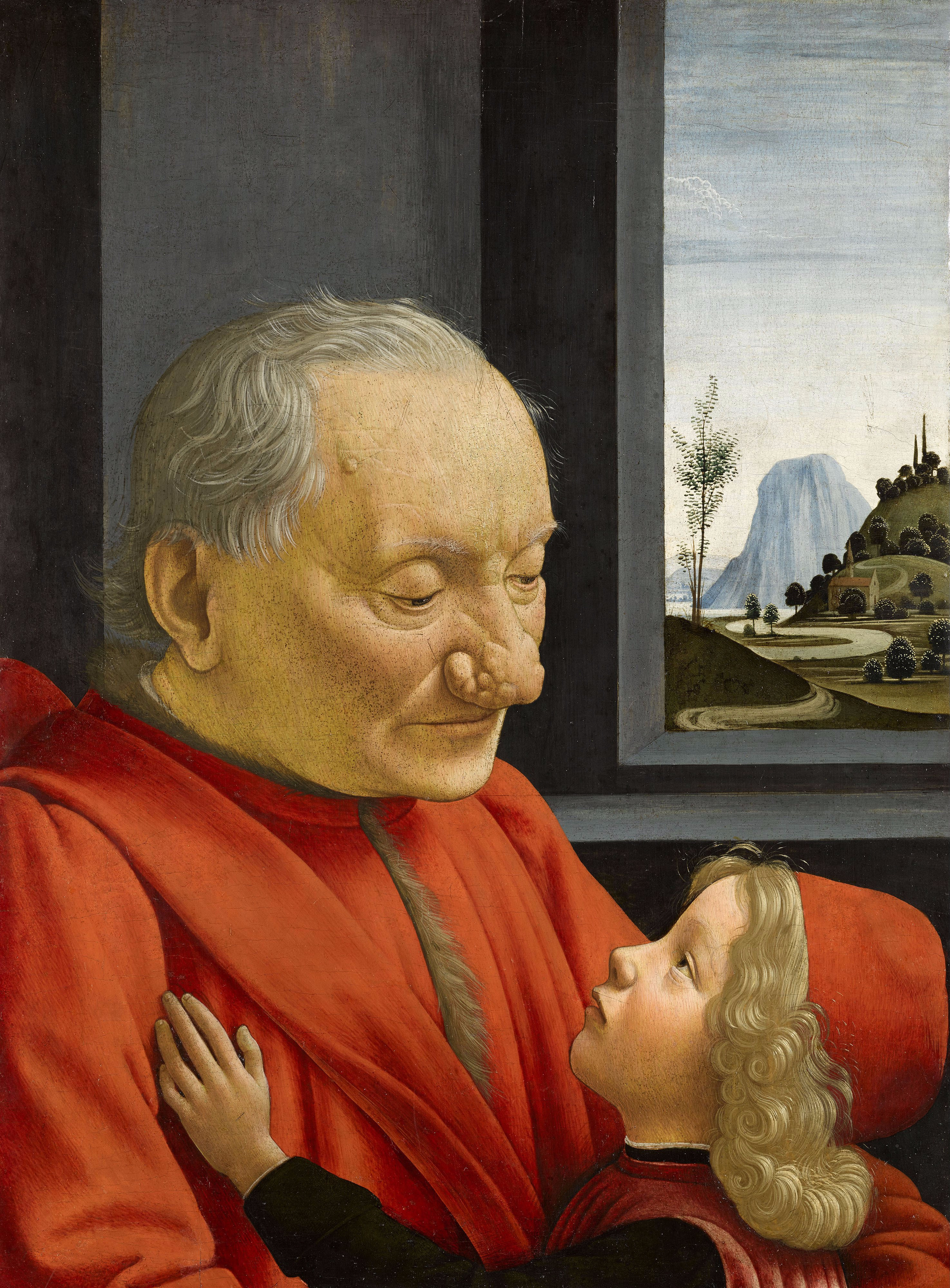
Portrait of an Old Man with his Grandson, (c. 1490) Louvre Museum

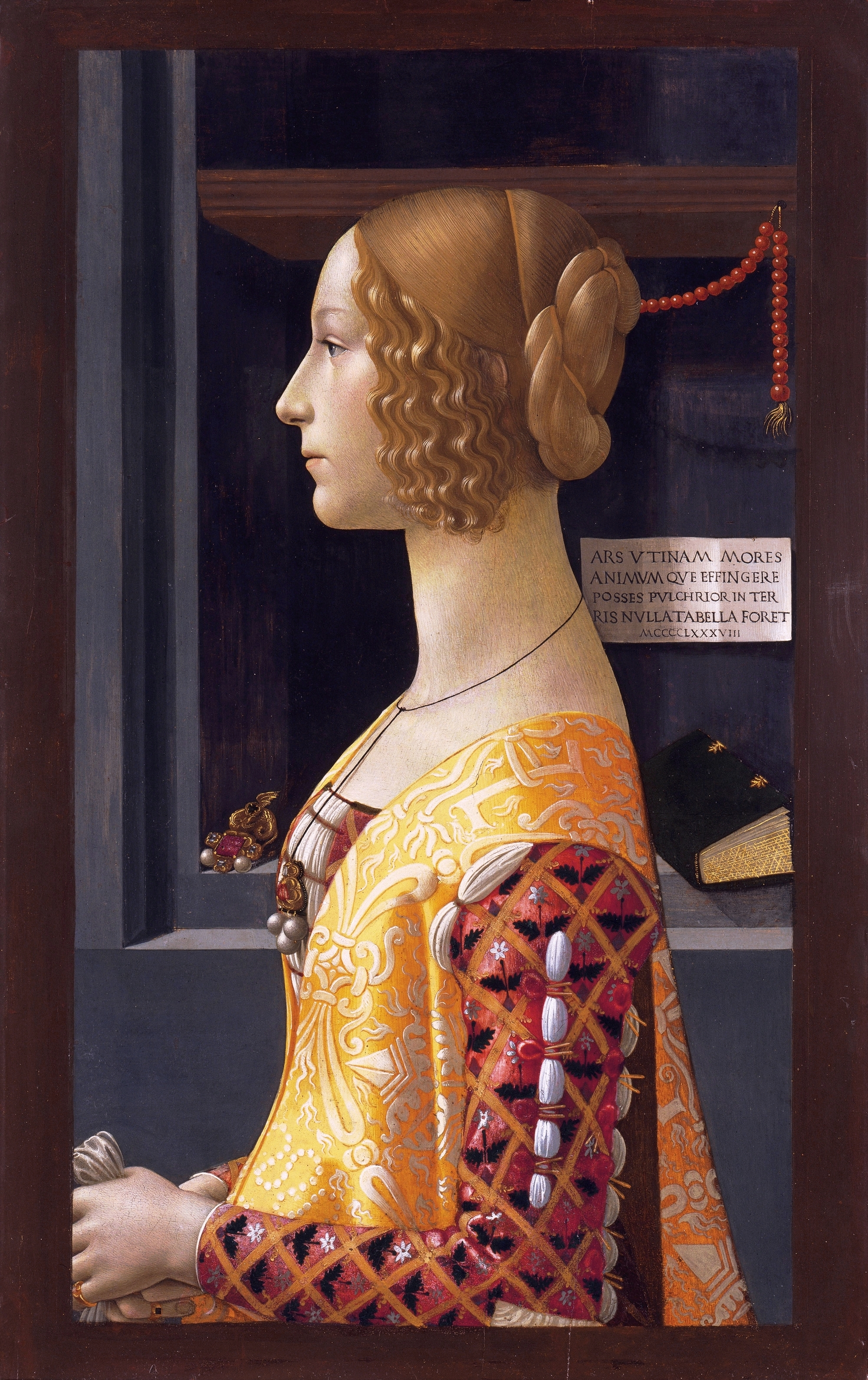
Portrait of Giovanna Tornabuoni, (1488) Museo Thyssen-Bornemisza, Madrid

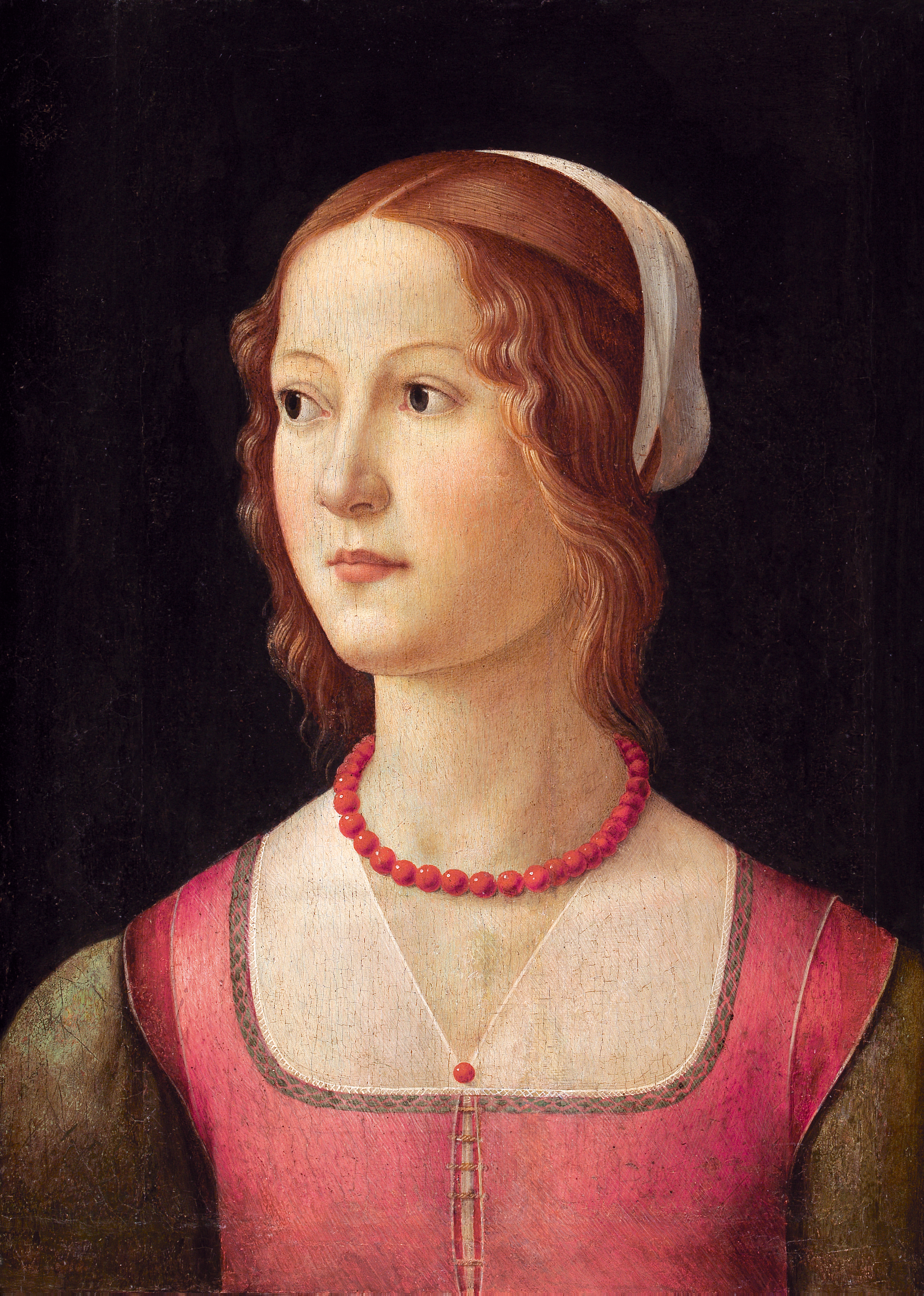
Portrait of a Young Woman, Museu Calouste Gulbenkian

=== Altarpieces ===
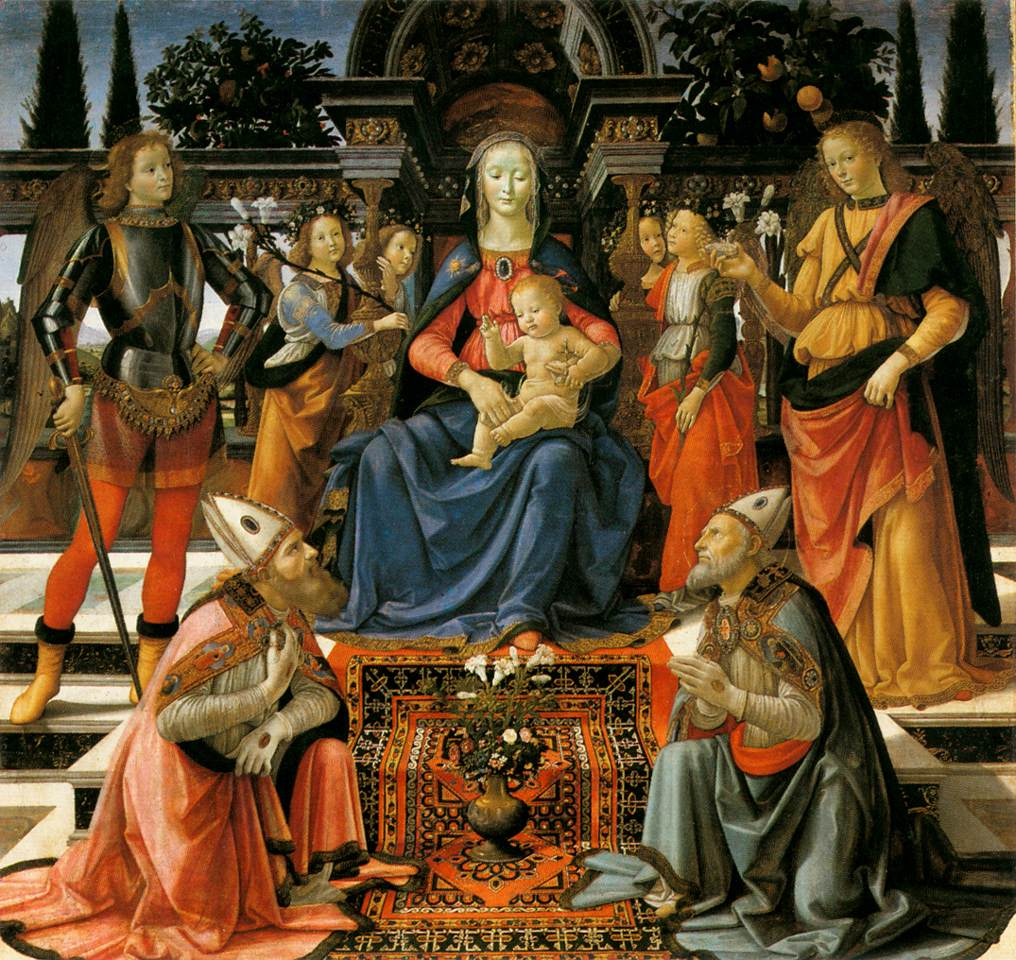
The Madonna and Child adored by St Zenobius and St Justus, (c. 1483), Uffizi, Florence

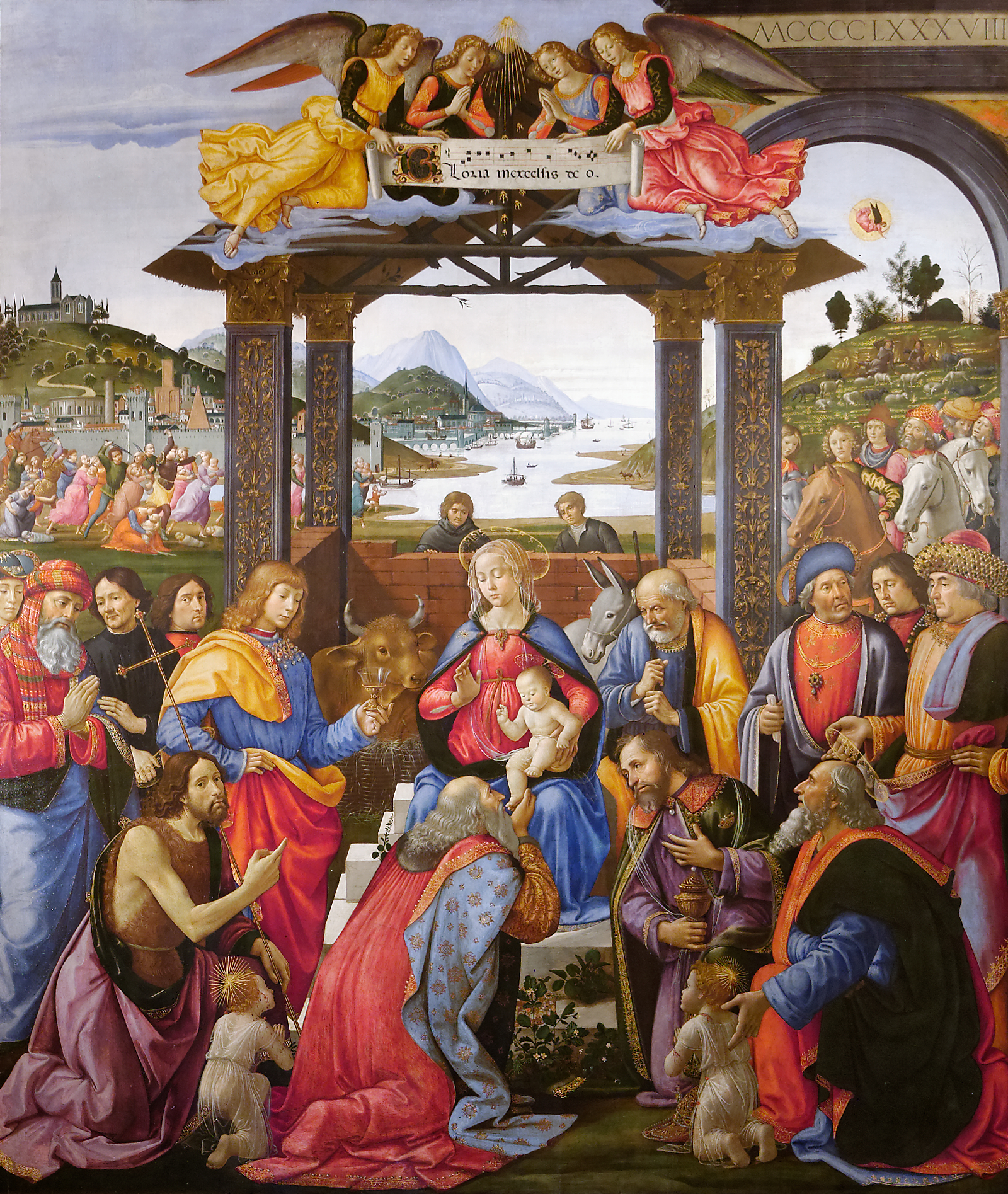
The Innocenti Adoration of the Magi, (1488–89), Ospedale degli Innocenti, Florence

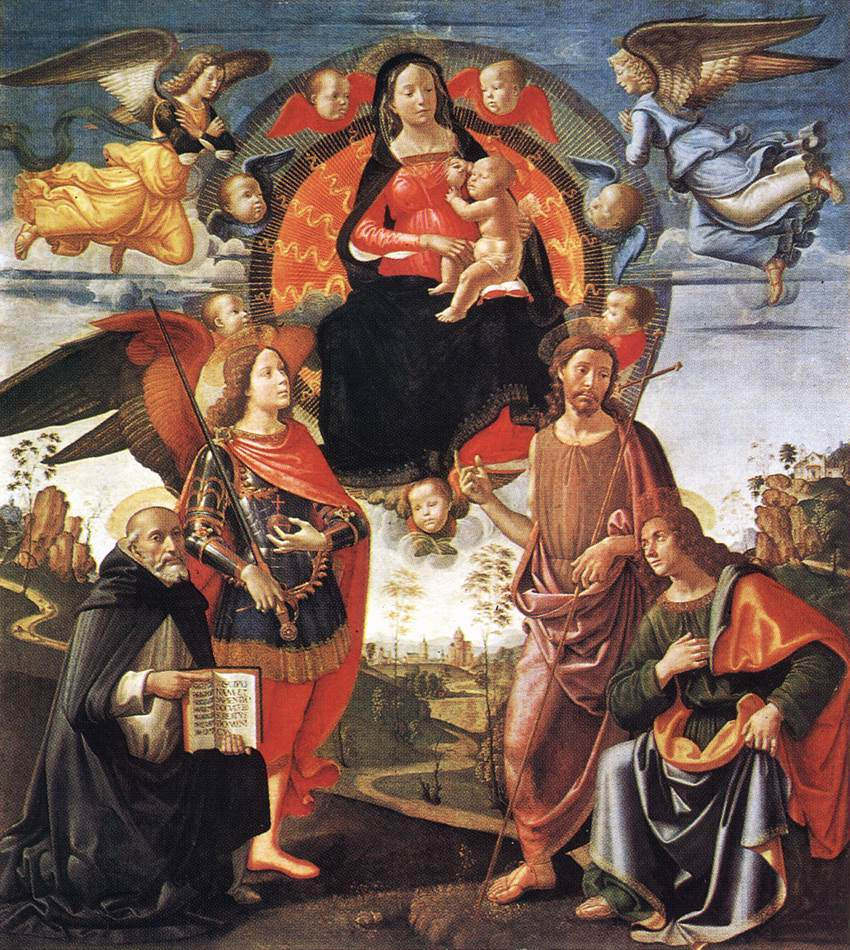
The Pala Tornabuoni, (c. 1490), Alte Pinakothek, Munich

=== Frescos ===
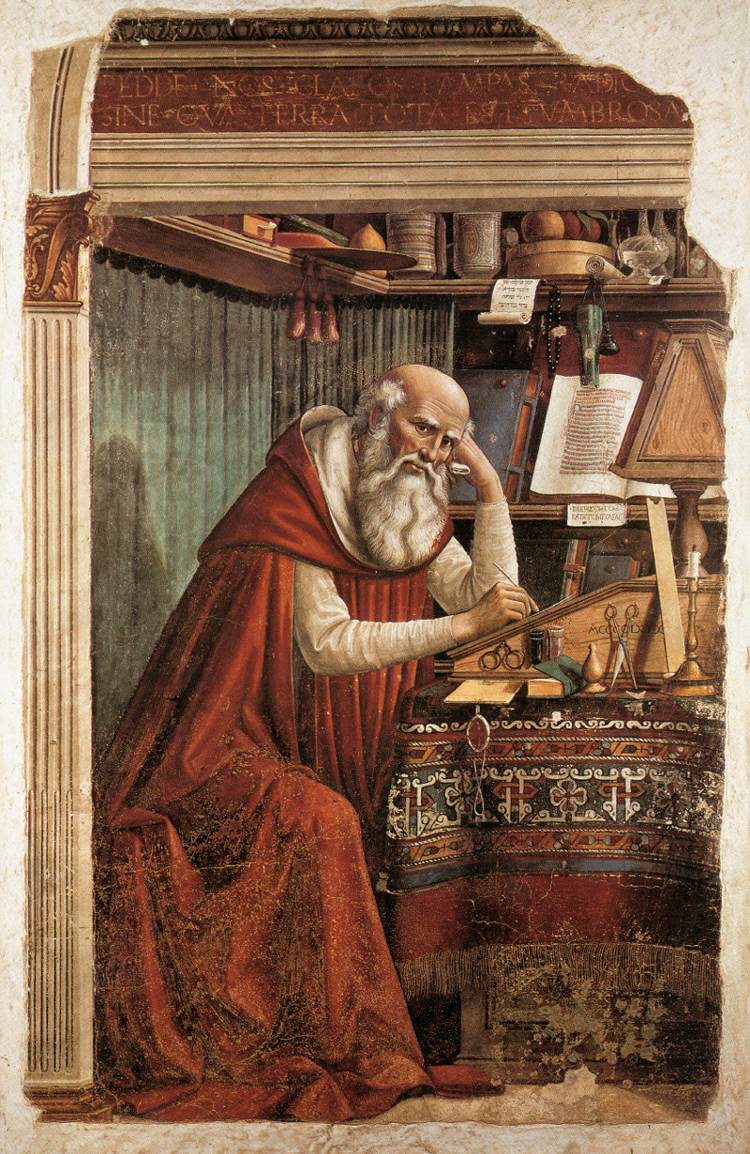
St Jerome, (1480), Ognissanti, Florence

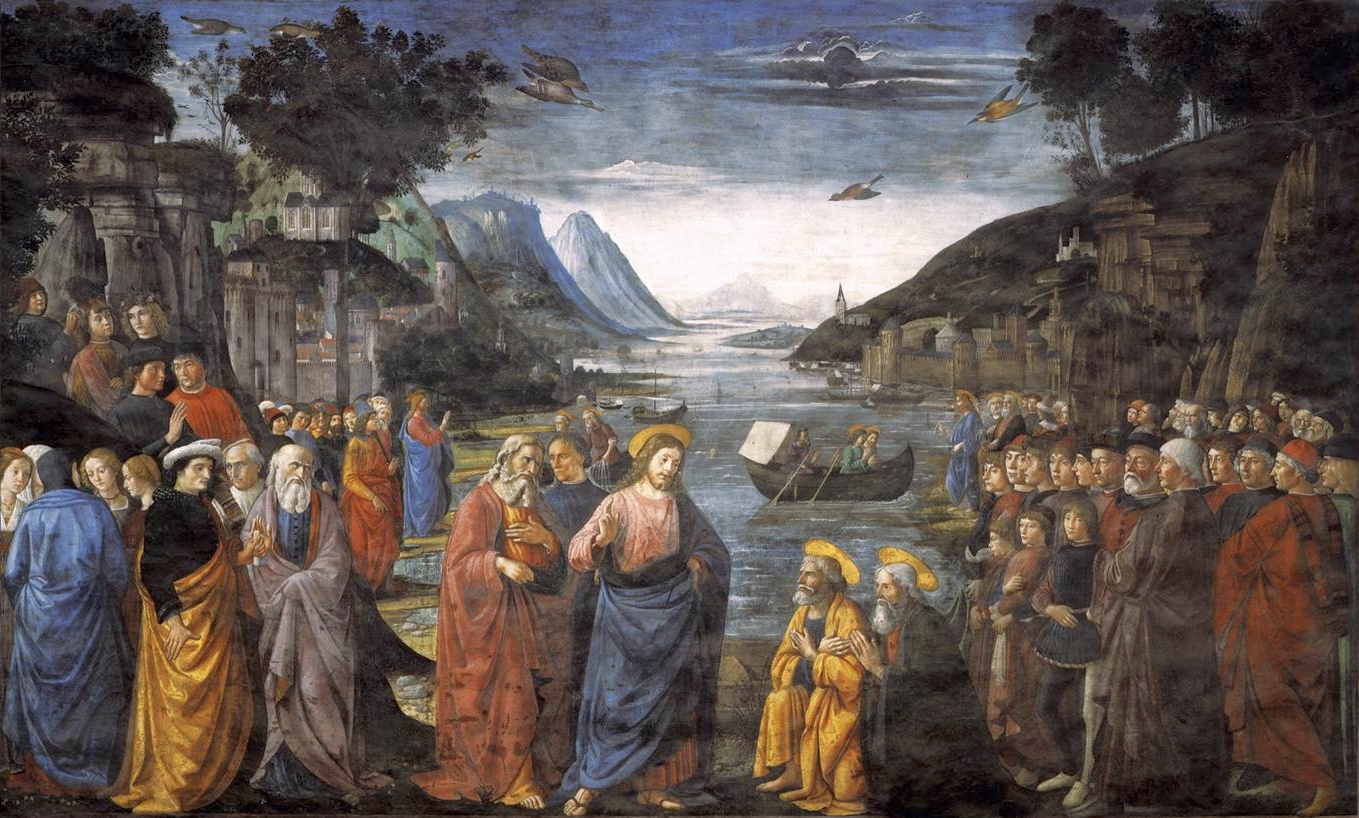
The Calling of the Apostles, (1481), one of the series in the Life of Christ commissioned for the Sistine Chapel

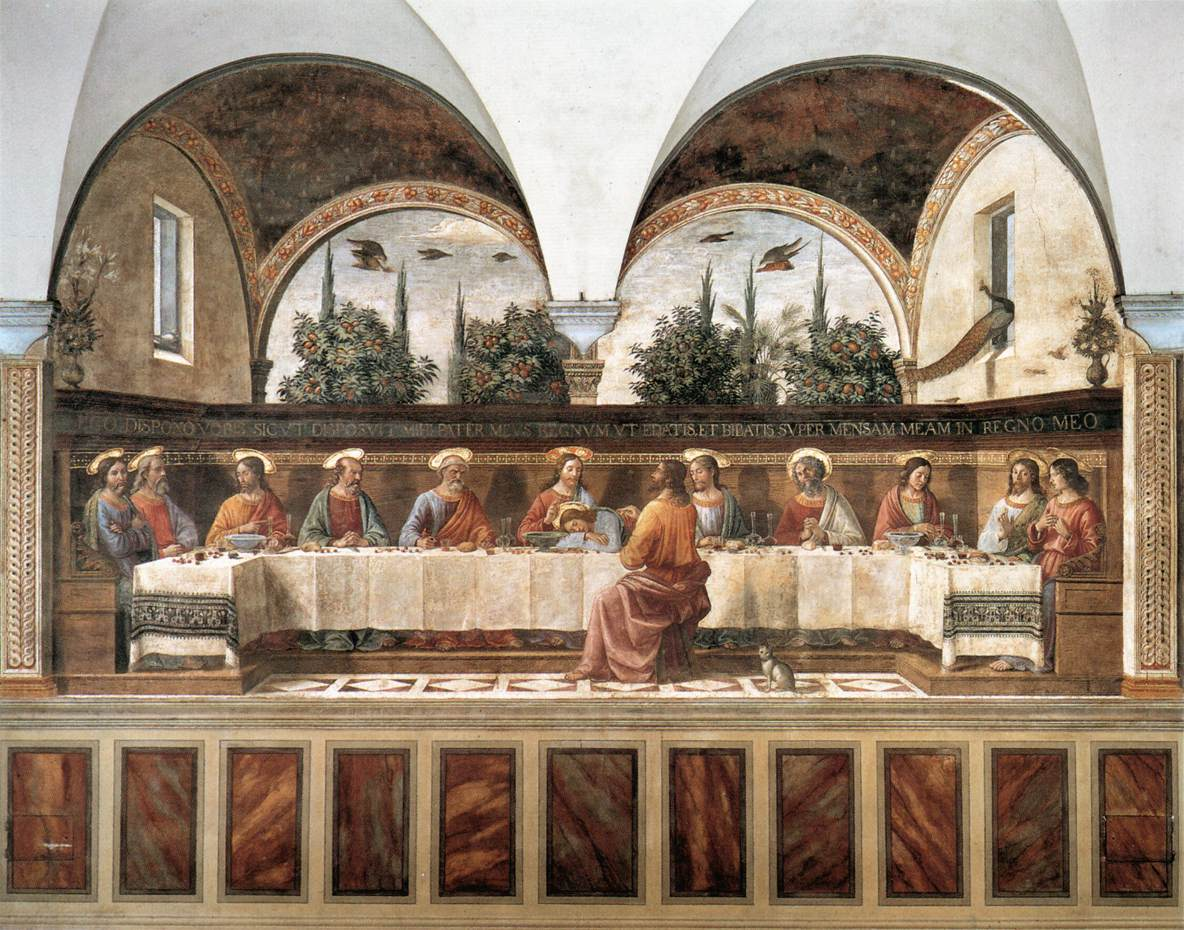
The Last Supper, (1486) San Marco, Florence

=== Details ===
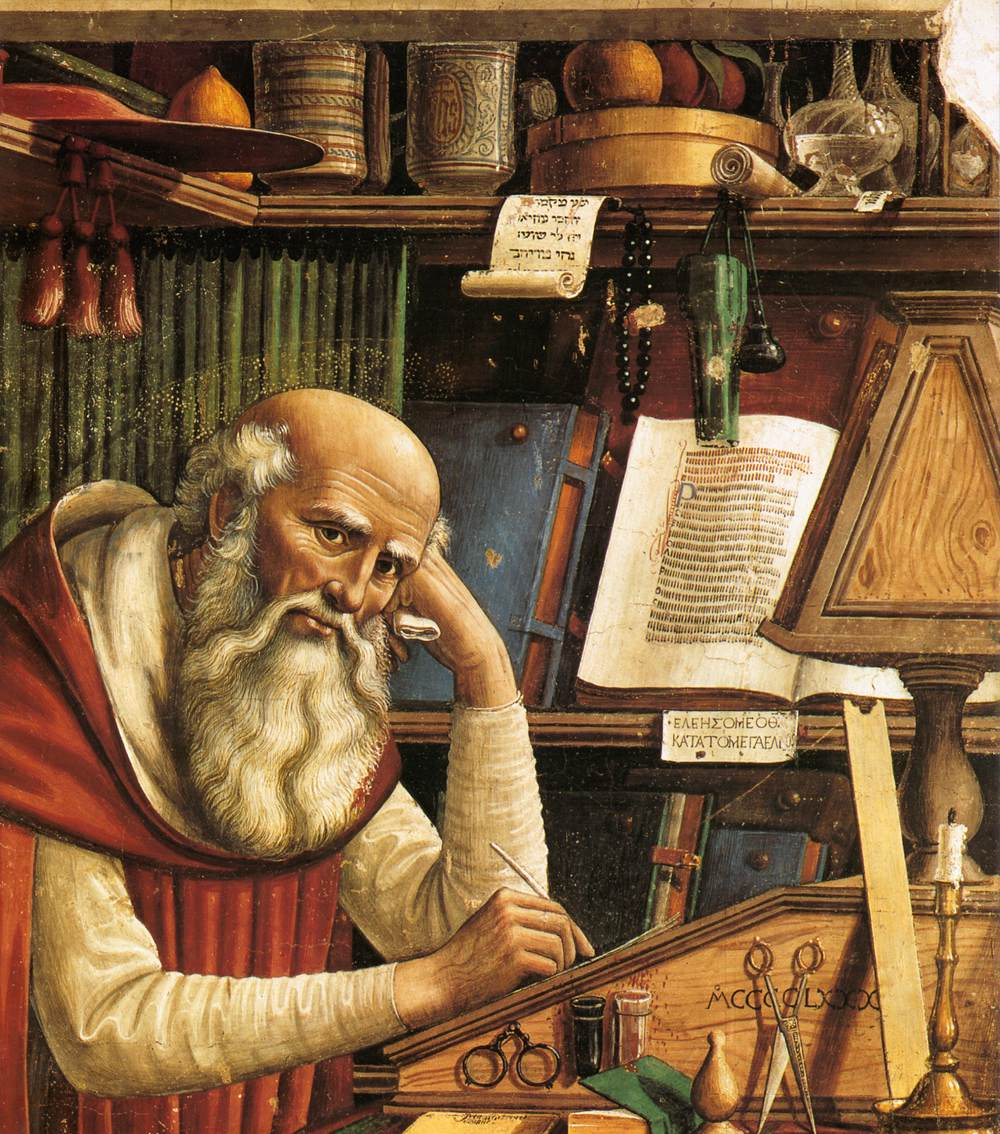
Detail of St Jerome in his Study, Still life objects include his cardinal's hat, spectacles, hourglass and seal

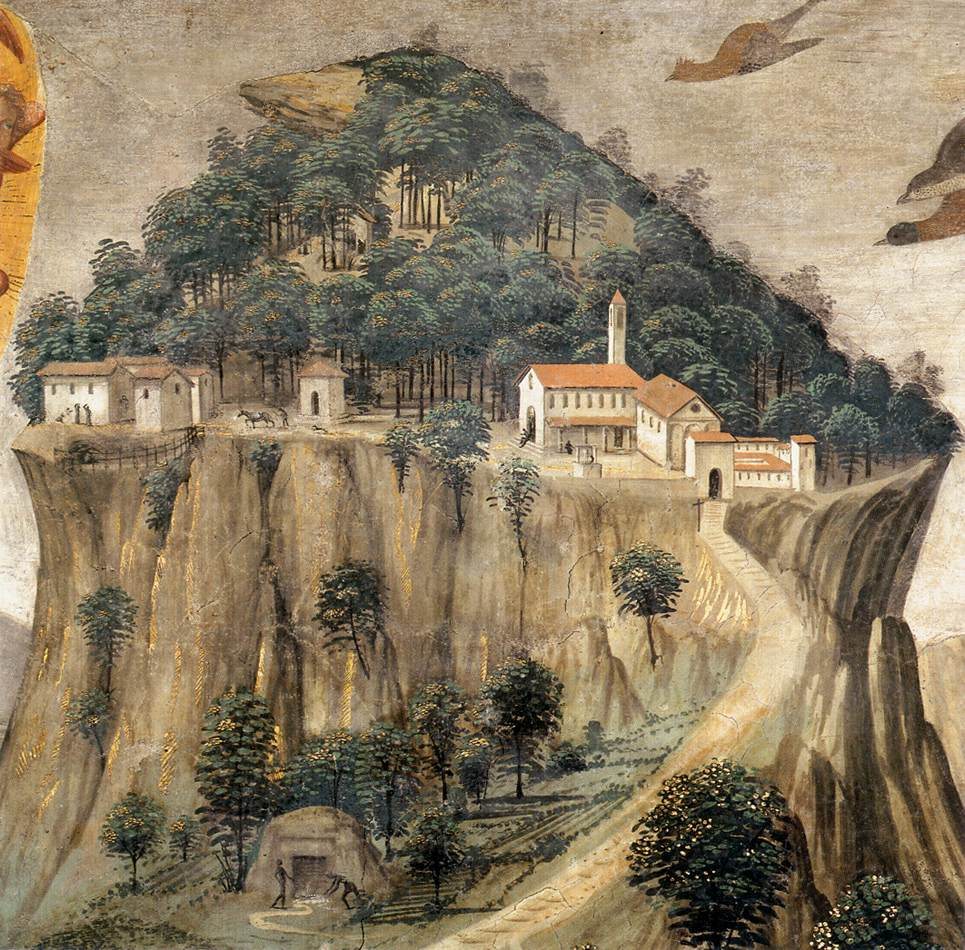
Detail of the landscape in The Stigmata of St Francis

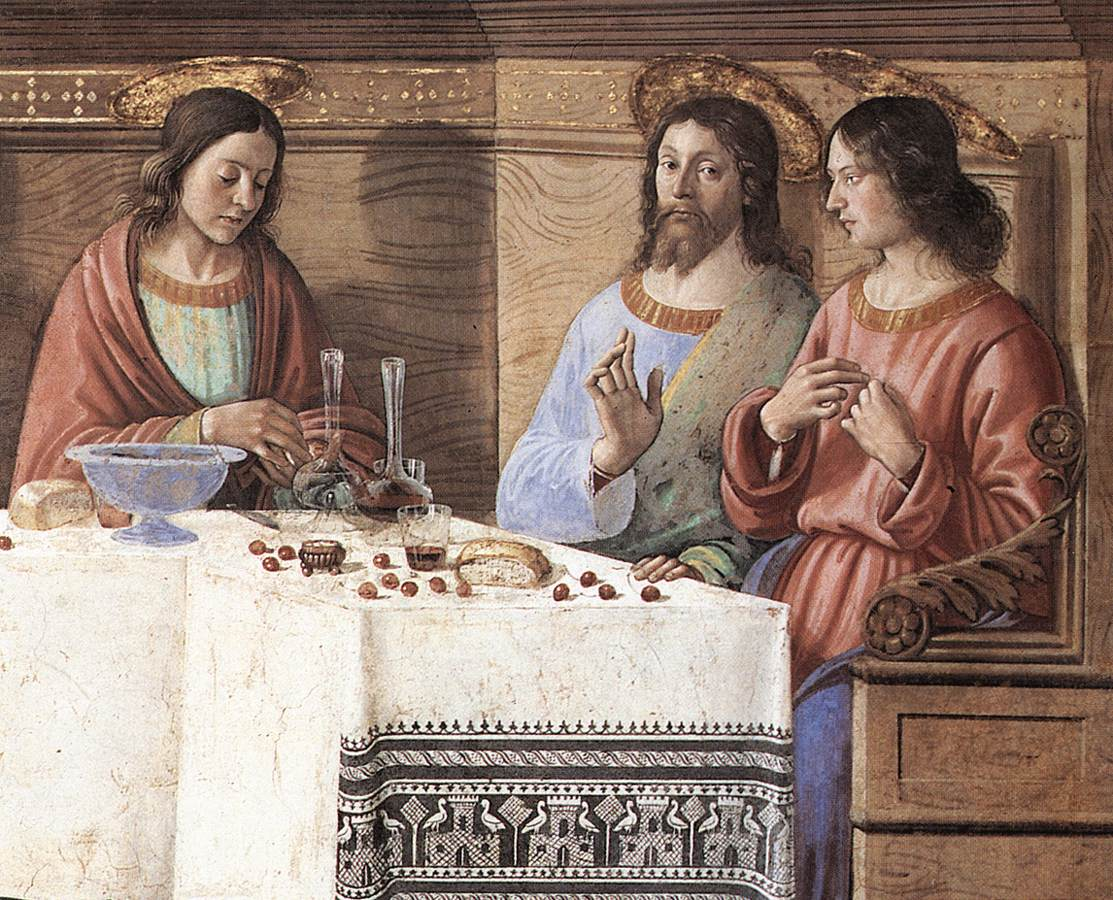
Detail of The Last Supper in San Marco's refectory showing Ghirlandaio's skill at the natural portrayal of figures and at painting objects such as bottles, cherries and silver salt cellar

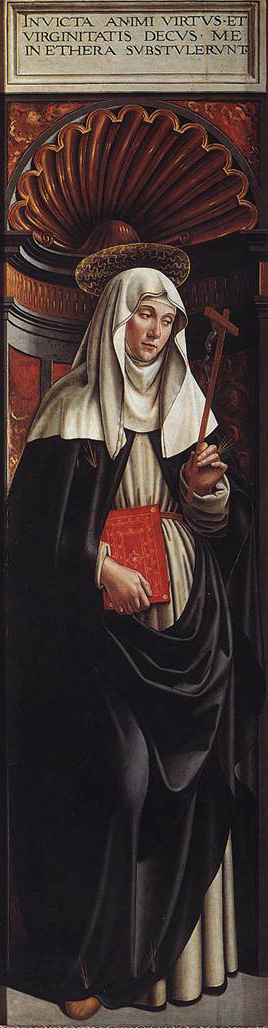
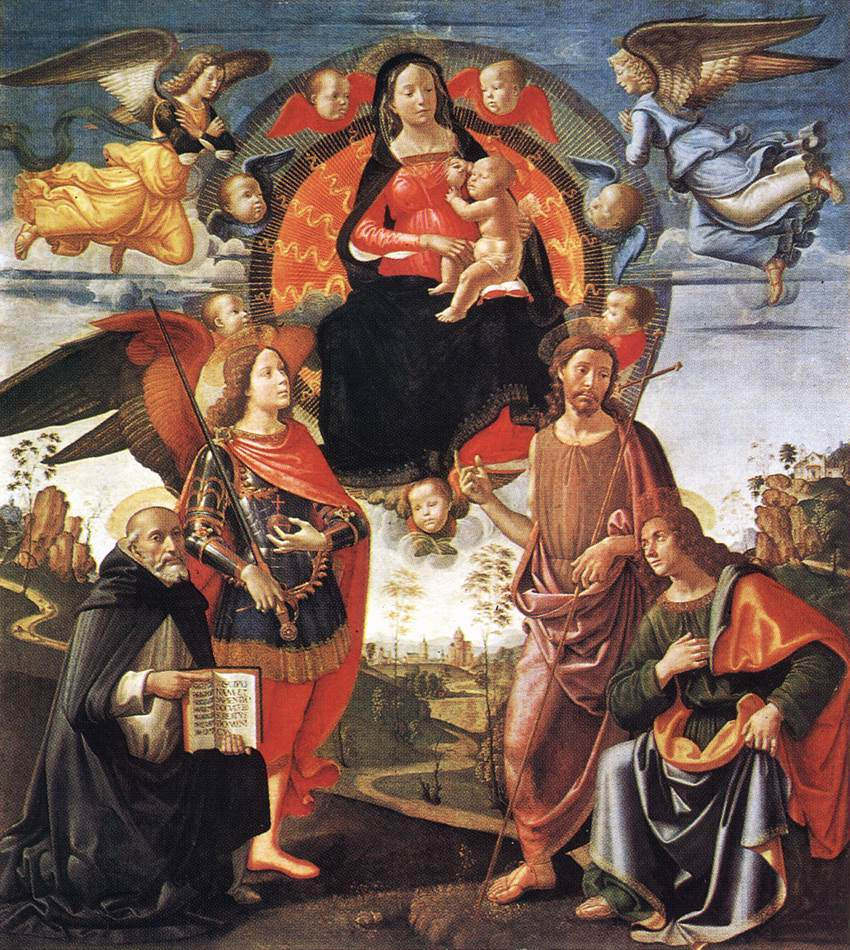
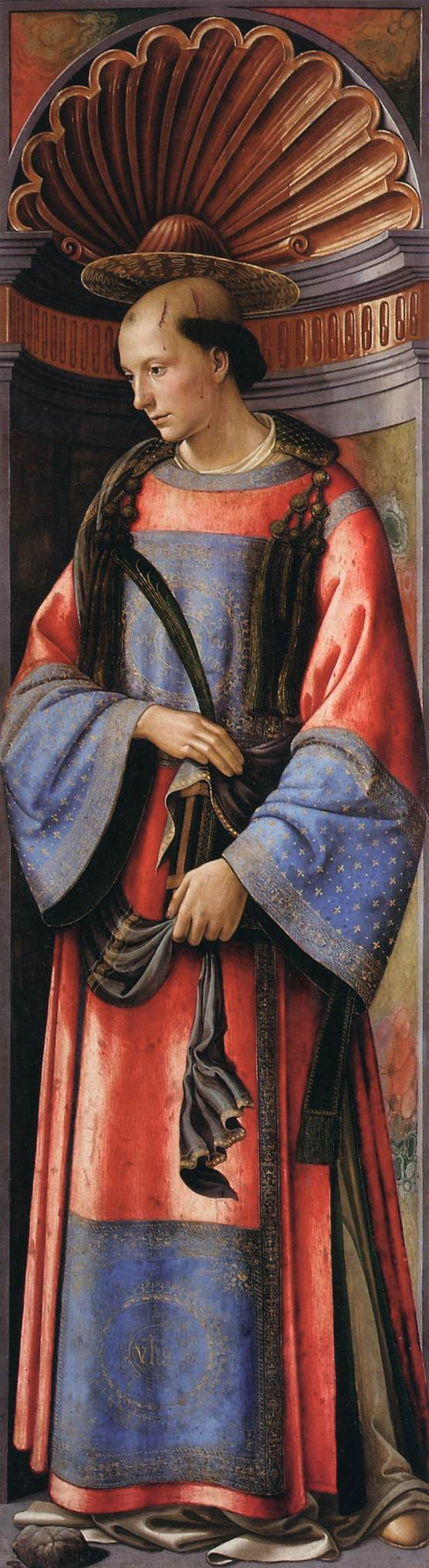
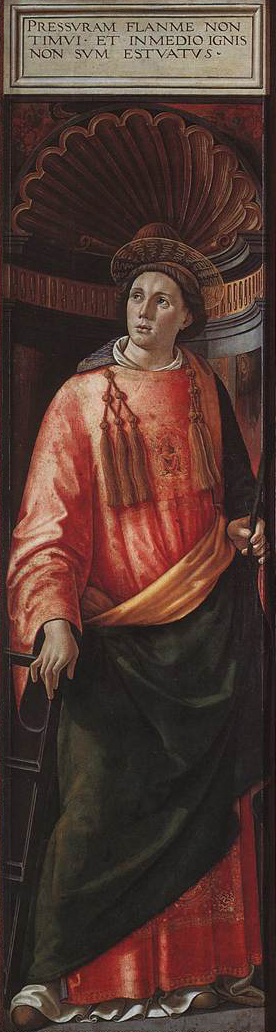
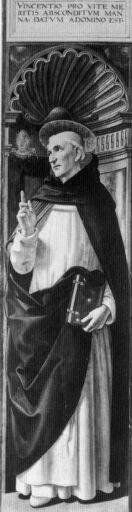

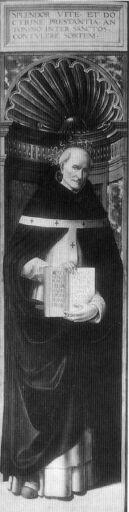

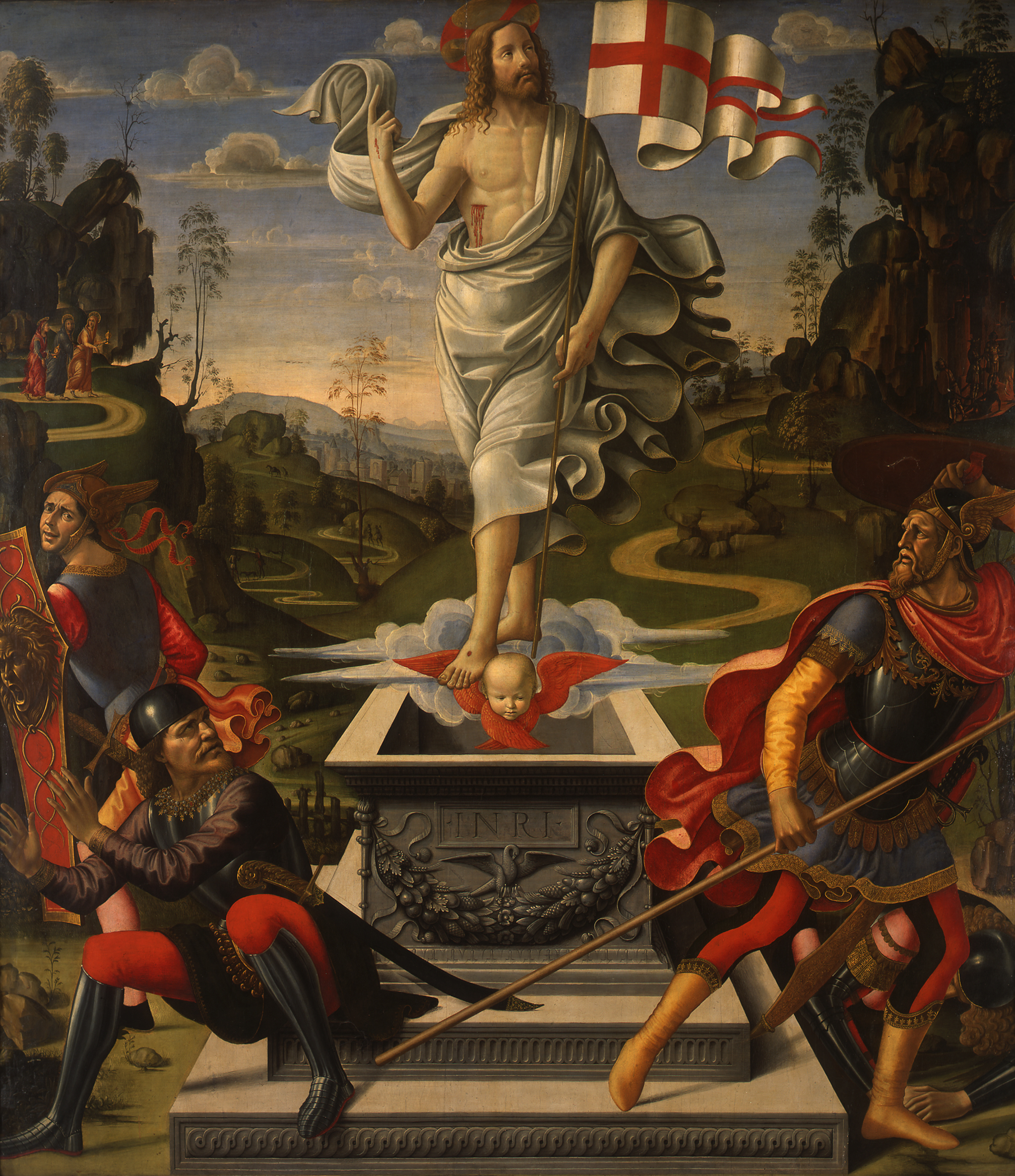

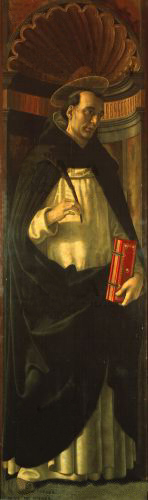

St Catherine of Siena

== See also ==
- Davide Ghirlandaio
- Benedetto Ghirlandaio
- Ridolfo Ghirlandaio

== Sources ==
- Chastel, André (1983). Art of the Italian Renaissance. Translated by Murray, Linda; Murray, Peter. London: Alpine Fine Arts Collection. ISBN 0-88168-139-3.
- Deimling, Barbara (2007). "Early Renaissance Art in Florence and Central Italy". In Toman, Rolf (ed.). The Art of the Italian Renaissance. Königswinter: Tandem Verlag GmbH. ISBN 978-3-8331-4674-9. LCCN 95015200. OCLC 1295422686.
