= Rhinophyma =

Development of a large, bulbous nose

- Other names: "Whiskey nose," "gin blossom," "potato nose."
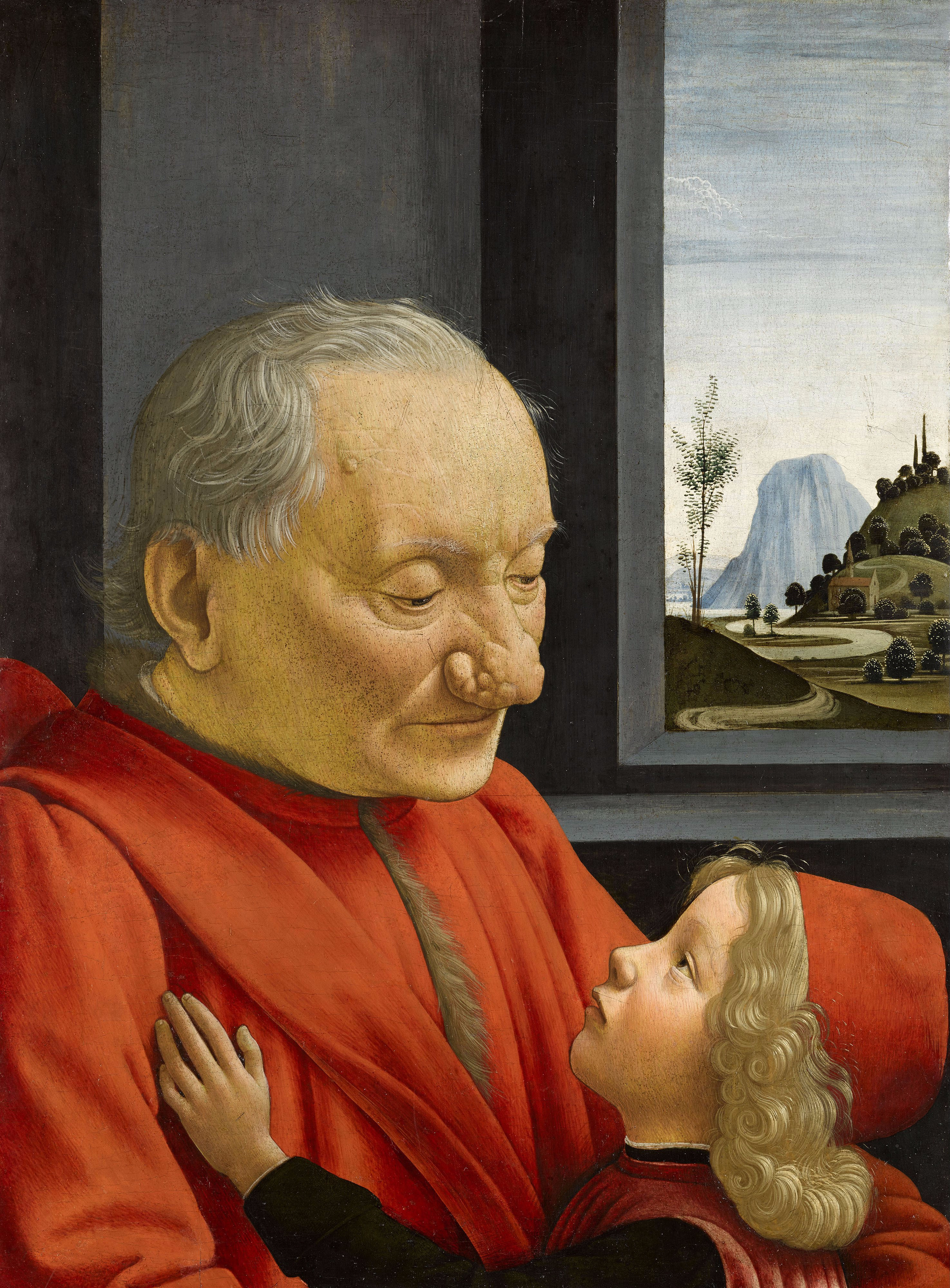
- An Old Man and His Grandson, by Domenico Ghirlandaio
- Specialty: Dermatology, ENT
- Usual onset: 50+
- Causes: Rosacea
- Differential diagnosis: Basal cell carcinoma, sarcoidosis, lymphoma, metastatic lung cancer, granuloma eosinophilicum, leishmaniasis.
- Treatment: Surgery, ablation, laser treatment

Rhinophyma is a condition causing development of a large, bulbous nose associated with granulomatous infiltration, commonly due to untreated rosacea. The condition is most common in older white males.

Colloquial terms for the rhinophyma include "whiskey nose", "gin blossom", "toros nose", and "potato nose".

== Signs and symptoms ==
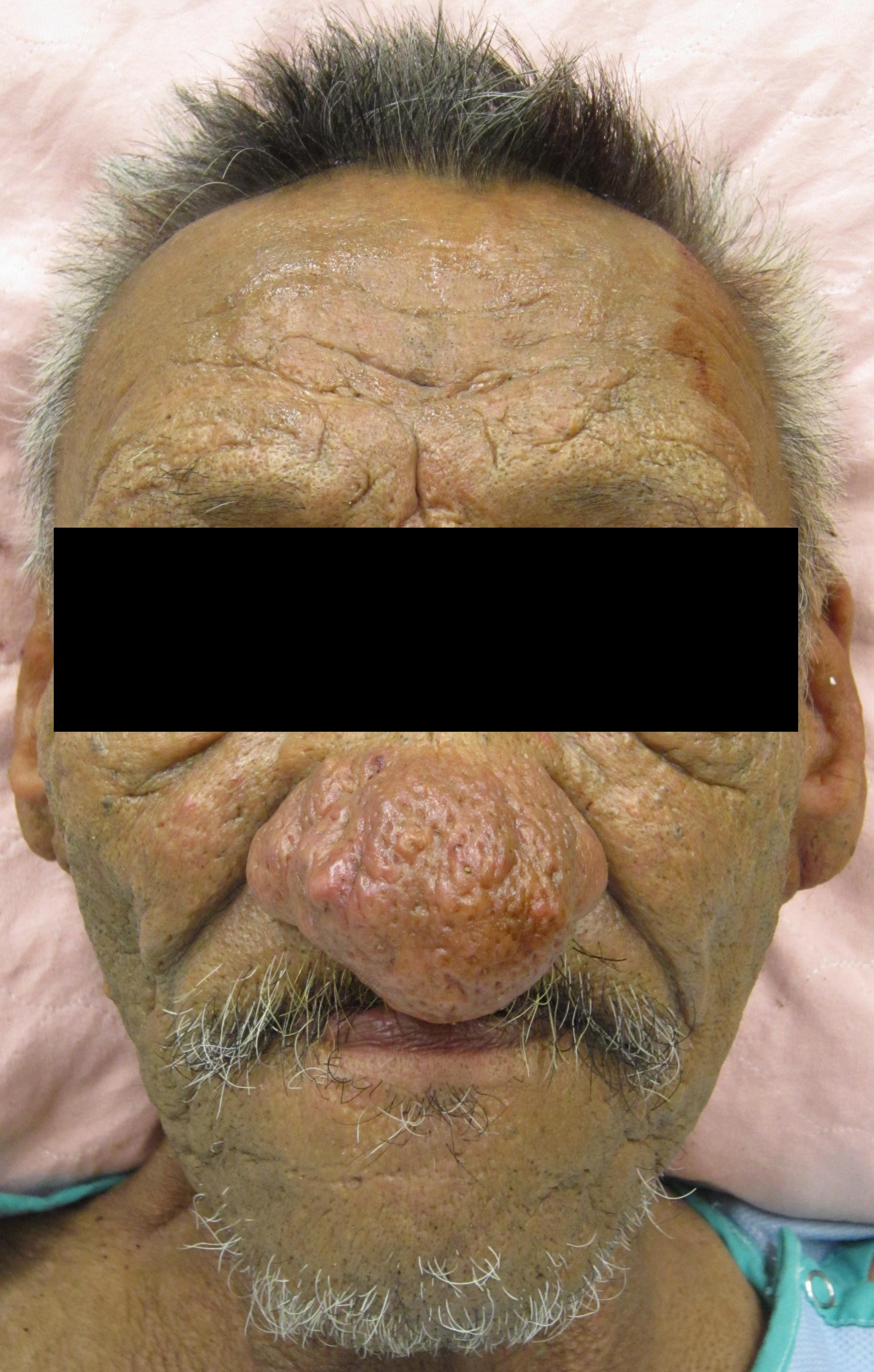
An example of severe rhinophyma

Rhinophyma is characterised by prominent pores and a fibrous thickening of the nose, sometimes with papules. It is associated with the common skin condition rosacea and it can be classified clinically into 5 grades of increasing severity.

=== Complications ===
Tissue thickening may come to cause airway obstruction and impede breathing.

Rhinophyma can cause psychological distress due to its effect on one's personal appearance, as well as social perception of a link with alcoholism.

== Causes ==
Rhinophyma develops in certain individuals with an unknown predisposition from long-standing rosacea which has progressed to a severe form.

Although rhinophyma has been commonly presumed to be linked to alcoholism, a direct causal relationship between the condition and excessive alcohol consumption has not been substantiated. Alcohol may cause increased flushing in those affected.

== Pathophysiology ==
Rhinophyma develops in some individuals after long-standing rosacea that has progressed to acne rosacea.

Rosacea usually commences in people between the age of 20–30 years. Rosacea begins with facial flushing (pre-rosacea). The nasal skin then thickens and hypervascularises, leading to persistent erythema (vascular rosacea). Papules and pustules then develop, marking the beginning of acne (inflammatory) rosacea. A subset of those affected by acne rosacea go on to develop rhinophyma. Chronic infection is common as the thickened sebaceous fluid traps bacteria.

Rhinophyma is characterised by hypertrophy of nasal skin, with hyperplasia and fibrosis of the sebaceous glands and connective tissue. The nasal tip and alae are preferentially affected by the hypertrophy, and the lower portion of the nose is predominantly affected. The underlying bony structure is not affected.

The exact pathophysiological mechanism underlying the development of rosacea and rhinophyma is unknown, but a combination of neurovascular and immune disturbance is thought to be involved, causing inflammation, fibrosis, and vascularisation.

=== Male predisposition ===
Even though females are more often affected by acne rosacea, they seldom go on to develop rhinophyma. It is thought that androgenic factors predispose men to develop rhinophyma.

== Diagnosis ==
Rhinophyma is diagnosed and graded clinically based on presentation. Diagnosis confirmation by pathology is highly recommended due to potential for differential diagnosis and ability of rhinophyma to hide underlying cancers. Pathology confirmation is especially important in areas endemic with leishmaniasis.

== Treatment ==
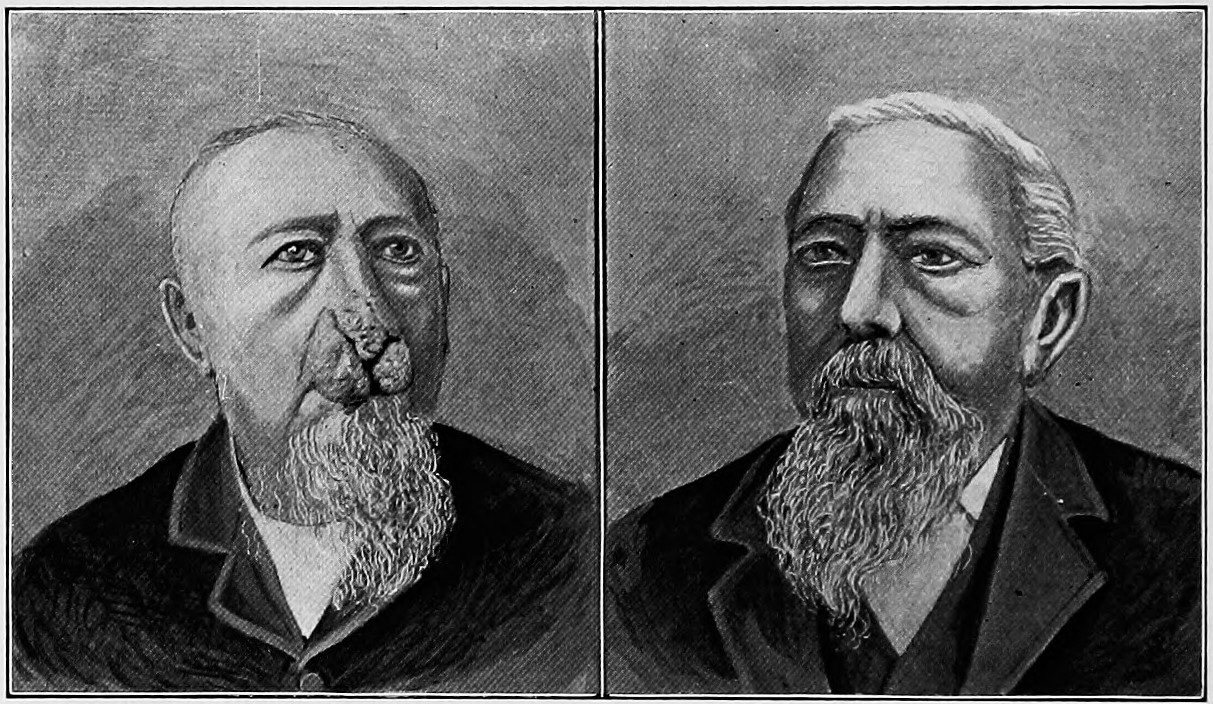
Operative treatment of rhinophyma, before and after

Treatment consists of paring down the bulk of the tissue with a sharp instrument or carbon dioxide laser and allowing the area to re-epithelialise. Sometimes, the tissue is completely excised and the raw area skin-grafted.

== Epidemiology ==
Rhinophyma is most common in males of European heritage over the age of 50. Males are 5 to 30 times as likely to be affected as females, possibly due to androgenic factors. In the United States, people of predominantly Asian and African ancestry are only rarely affected by the condition.

== Society ==
Colloquial names for the condition include "whiskey nose", "gin blossom", and "potato nose". The condition has often been presumed to be a result of alcoholism, even though it remains unclear whether alcohol actually contributes to the development of rhinophyma. This popular association with alcohol has contributed to stigmatization of people with the condition.

In film, villainous characters have been portrayed as having rhinophyma, notably the evil queen (when disguised as a witch) in the animated film Snow White and the Seven Dwarfs.

Among those known to have had the disease before modern treatment were the American banker J. P. Morgan and the American comedian W. C. Fields.
