= An Old Man and his Grandson =

Painting by Domenico Ghirlandaio

- An Old Man and His Grandson
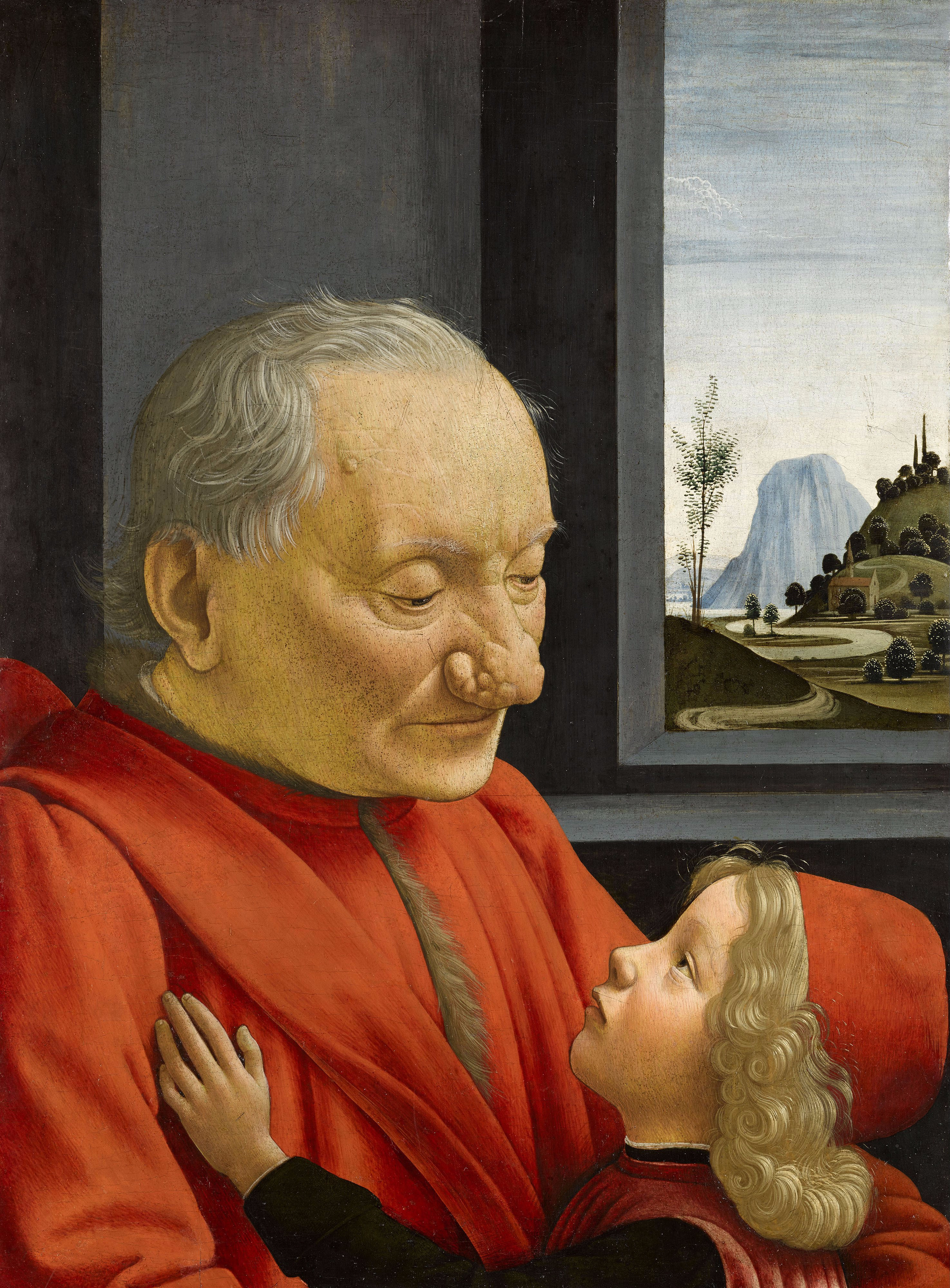
- Artist: Domenico Ghirlandaio
- Year: c. 1490
- Medium: tempera, poplar panel
- Dimensions: 62.7 cm (24.7 in) × 46.3 cm (18.2 in) × 8 cm (3.1 in)
- Location: Room 710, France
- Owner: French State
- Accession: RF 266

An Old Man and his Grandson (Italian: Ritratto di vecchio con nipote) is a ca. 1490 tempera painting by the Italian Renaissance artist Domenico Ghirlandaio. One of Ghirlandaio's best-known works, it is considered notable for its emotional poignancy. Its realism has been described as unique among the portraits of the Quattrocento.

== Description ==
The picture portrays an older man in a red robe, embracing a young child who is also wearing red. They sit in an interior, illuminated against a darkened wall. Behind them at right is a window through which can be seen a generalized landscape, its uneven terrain and winding roads typical of Ghirlandaio's backgrounds. Although the man's fur-lined robe and cappuccio and the boy's elegant doublet and cap indicate a noble heritage, and despite the traditional assumption that the subjects are grandfather and grandson, their identities are unknown. It is possible that the painting was commemorative in purpose, and that the child was a narrative invention intended to emphasize the man's beneficence. The poignancy of the image is dramatized by the contrast between the man's weathered and wise face, and the child's delicate profile. While the composition is thematically related to portraiture from the Netherlands, by the mid-15th century the motif of a portrait in an interior with a landscape seen in the distance was common in Italy.

An extraordinary feature of the painting is the deformity of the man's nose, evidence of rhinophyma. Ghirlandaio has presented the portrait in a naturalistic and sympathetic fashion, at variance with physiognomic theory of the era, which maintained a connection between external appearances and internal truths. Rather than implying a defect of character, An Old Man and his Grandson invites appreciation of the man's virtuousness. The painting depicts a moment of intimacy between an old man and a child, underscored by the placement of the child's hand on the man's chest, and the man's gentle expression. This show of affection endows the picture with emotional qualities beyond those expected from a traditional dynastic portrait. In the words of art historian Bernard Berenson, "There is no more human picture in the entire range of Quattrocento painting, whether in or out of Italy."

The painting's provenance is uncertain until 1880, when it entered the Louvre, and then only after it was rejected by the Kaiser Friedrich Museum in Berlin out of concern for its condition. Several commentators in the late nineteenth century reported that the picture had been abraded by overcleaning, and there were disfiguring scratches on the man's face. In 1996 the scratches and areas of discolored inpainting were removed, and the painting was cleaned and retouched.

A drawing by Ghirlandaio entitled Head of an Old Man, once owned by Giorgio Vasari, portrays the same man as in the painting. The drawing may have been made while the sitter was asleep, or after his death, in which case it would have served as a graphic death mask.

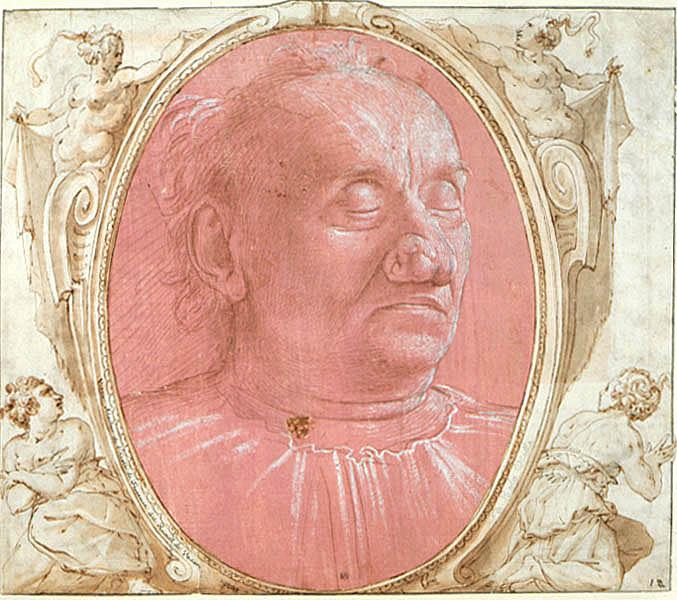
Head of an Old Man. Metalpoint drawing on pink paper, heightened with white. 28.1 cm x 21.5 cm. Nationalmuseum, Stockholm.

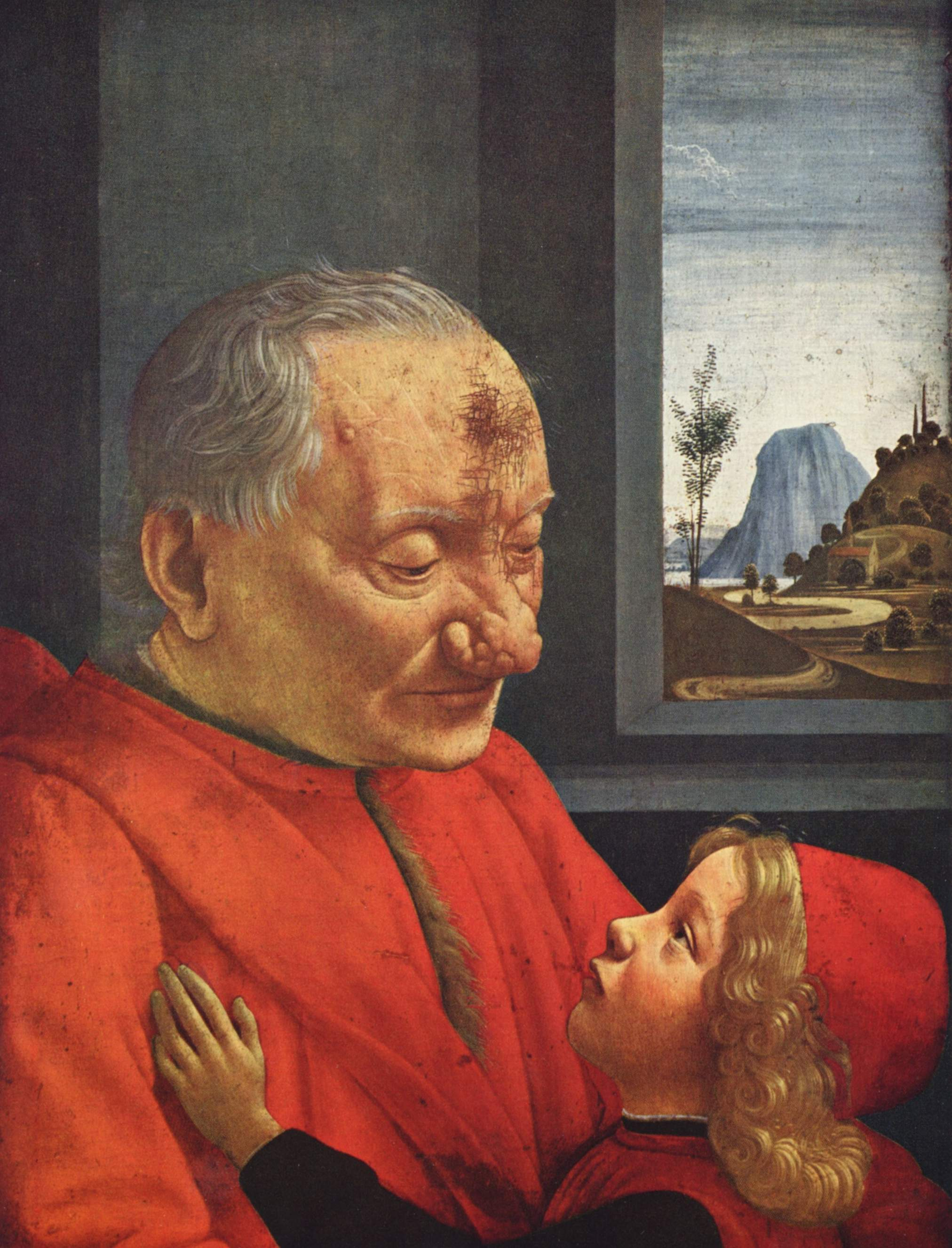
Before the 1996 restoration.
