= Bastiano Mainardi =

Italian painter (1466–1513)

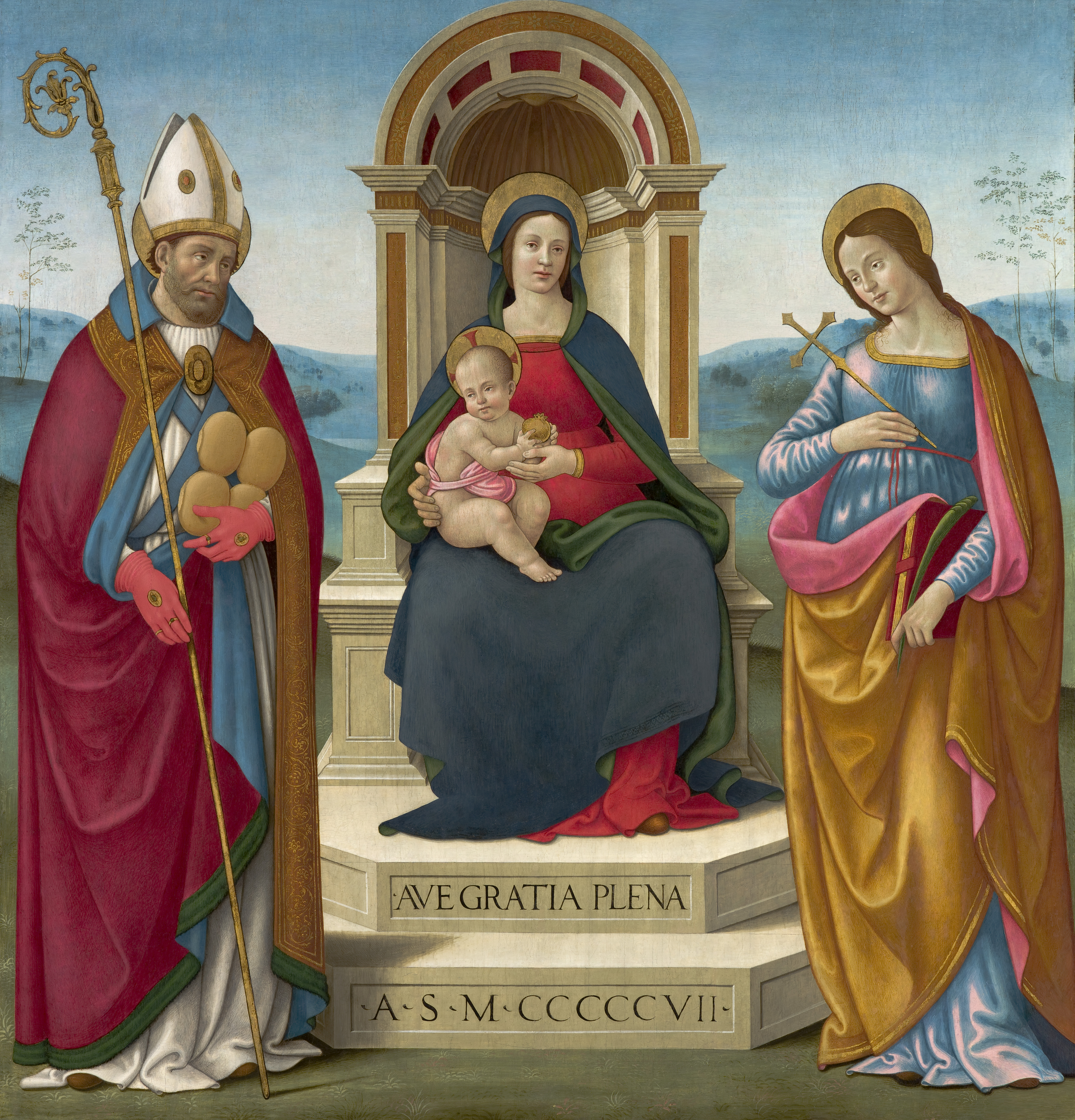
Madonna and Child with Saints Justus and Margaret (1507), Indianapolis Museum of Art

Bastiano di Bartolo Mainardi (1466–1513) was an Italian painter of the Early Renaissance. He was born in San Gimignano and was active there and in Florence.

According to Giorgio Vasari, Mainardi is portrayed in the frescoes in the Sassetti and Tornabuoni Chapels by Domenico Ghirlandaio, Mainardi's brother-in-law and master. Vasari also claimed that Mainardi took part in Ghirlandaio's frescoes (1476) in the Abbey of Passignano in Val di Pesa, near Florence, and in the chapel of Saint Fina in the Collegiata of San Gimginano (1485). The Annunciation fresco in the loggia of San Gimignano's Collegiata, dated 1482, is often also attributed to Mainardi. Mainardi's authorship of these works was, however, proven impossible when Italian art historian Lisa Venturini discovered Mainardi's birthdate as 1466 (it was previously placed around 1460 or earlier). Thus, Mainardi was too young to have assisted Ghirlandaio in these works or to have painted the Annunciation San Gimignano (which is now regarded as a work by Domenico Ghirlandaio's brother, Davide). Further, Mainardi could probably not have painted most of the Ghirlandaio workshop paintings once attributed to him, like the famous tondo of the Madonna and Child with the Infant Saint John the Baptist and Three Angels at the Louvre.

Mainardi's secure works are nevertheless strongly indebted to Ghirlandaio's, and the artist had a lifelong affiliation with the Ghirlandaio family workshop. One of his latest works, an altarpiece of the Madonna and Child with Saints, commissioned in 1511 for the church of Sant'Agostino in San Gimignano (where it remains today), was completed after his death in 1513 by Domenico Ghirlandaio's son, Ridolfo.

== Paintings by Bastiano Mainardi ==
Art historians recognize the following paintings as certainly by Mainardi and among his most important works:

- Saint Gimignano Blessing Three Men above a Memorial to Domenico Strambi, dated 1488, fresco (San Gimignano, Sant'Agostino).
- Saint Jerome; Madonna and Child, both dated 1490, frescoes (Florence, Museo Nazionale del Bargello).
- Madonna della Cintola, circa 1492–95, fresco (Florence, Santa Croce, Baroncelli chapel).
- Frescoes, including Saints Gimignano, Lucy, Augustine and the Four Evangelist in the vault of the chapel of San Bartolo in the church Sant'Agostino, San Gimignano, formerly signed and dated 1500.
- Pietà with the Decapitated Saint John the Baptist and Saint Paul, dated 1500, panel, originally in the Altoviti family chapel in the Palazzo dei Vicari, Certaldo (Schwerin, Staatlisches Museum).
- Frescoes with the Madonna and Child and Saints, circa 1500–10 (San Gimignano, Ospedale di Santa Fina).
- Madonna and Child with Two Angels, circa 1502, tondo (San Gimignano, Museo Civico).
- Madonna and Child with Saints Jerome and Bernardo Tolomei, dated 1502, panel (San Gimignano, Museo Civico; originally in the Mainardi family chapel in the church of Monteoliveto, outside San Gimignano).
- Madonna and Child with an Angel, circa 1502, tondo (San Gimignano, Museo Civico).
- Madonna and Child in Glory with Saints Augustine, Gimignano, Mary Magdalen, John the Baptist and Catherine (painted in collaboration with Biagio d'Antonio), circa 1502, panel (San Gimignano, Museo Civico).
- Madonna of the Seven Sorrows with Saints Gregory and Peter Martyr, circa 1505, panel (Campi Bisenzio, Florence, Santi Lorenzo e Martino).
- Madonna and Child with Saints Sebastian, Francis, Tobias and the Angel and Bernardino of Siena, circa 1505, fresco (Incisa Val d'Arno, San Lorenzo a Cappiano).
- Nativity with Saints Jerome and Francis, circa 1505, panel (Pelago, Florence, Museo d'Arte Sacra).
- Madonna and Child with Saints Julian and Francis, dated 1506, panel (Palermo, Chiaramonte Bordonaro Collection).
- Madonna and Child with Saints Dominic, Lawrence, John the Baptist and Lucy, 1507, panel (Incisa Val d'Arno, Museo d'Arte Sacra).
- Madonna and Child with Saints Justus and Margaret, dated 1507, panel (Indianapolis Museum of Art).
- Madonna and Child with Saints Benedict, Michael, Cassiano, Ambrose and Dominic, dated 1511, panel (Palazzuolo sul Senio, Santo Stefano).
