= Benedetto Ghirlandaio =

Italian painter (1458–1497)

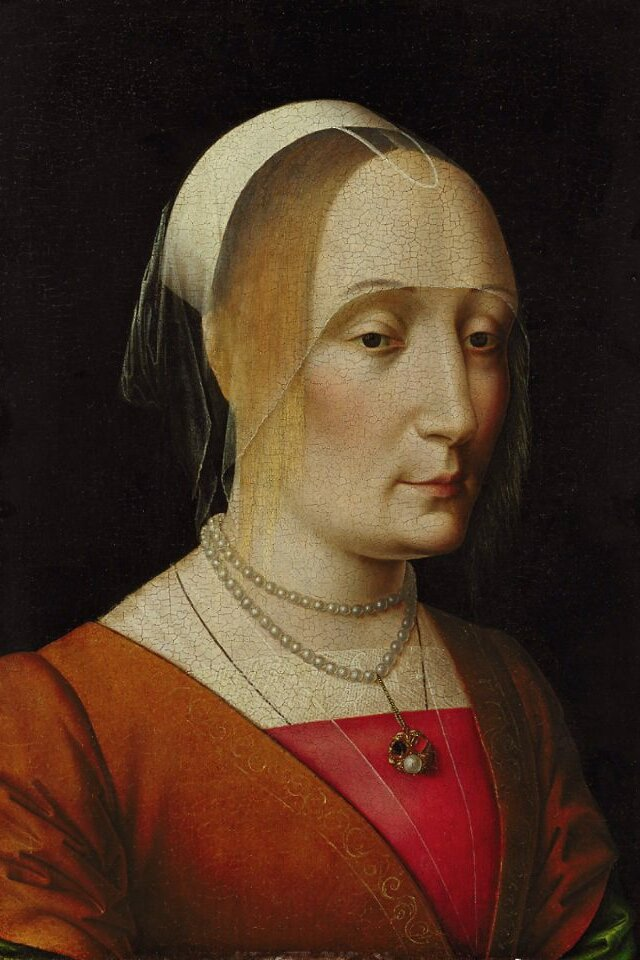
Portrait of a Lady, oil on panel painting by Benedetto Ghirlandaio, Minneapolis Institute of Arts

Benedetto Ghirlandaio (1458–1497) was an Italian (Florentine) painter. His brothers Davide Ghirlandaio (1452–1525) and Domenico Ghirlandaio (1449–1494) were both painters, as was his nephew Ridolfo Ghirlandaio (1483–1561). From 1486 until 1493 he was active in France, where survives his only extant signed painting, an altarpiece of the Nativity at Nôtre-Dame in Aigueperse (Puy-de-Dôme, Auvergne). Benedetto died in Florence on 17 July 1497.
