= Pollaiolo =

Pollaiolo or Pollaiuolo is the name of several people, including:

- Antonio del Pollaiuolo (1429/1433–1498), Italian Renaissance artist in goldsmithing, sculpture and painting
- Piero del Pollaiuolo (1443–1496), Italian Renaissance painter, younger brother of Antonio
- Simone del Pollaiolo (1457–1508), Italian Renaissance architect, nephew of Antonio and Piero

== See also ==
- Carlo Francesco Pollarolo (1653–1723), Italian composer.
