= Davide Ghirlandaio =

Italian painter (1452–1525)

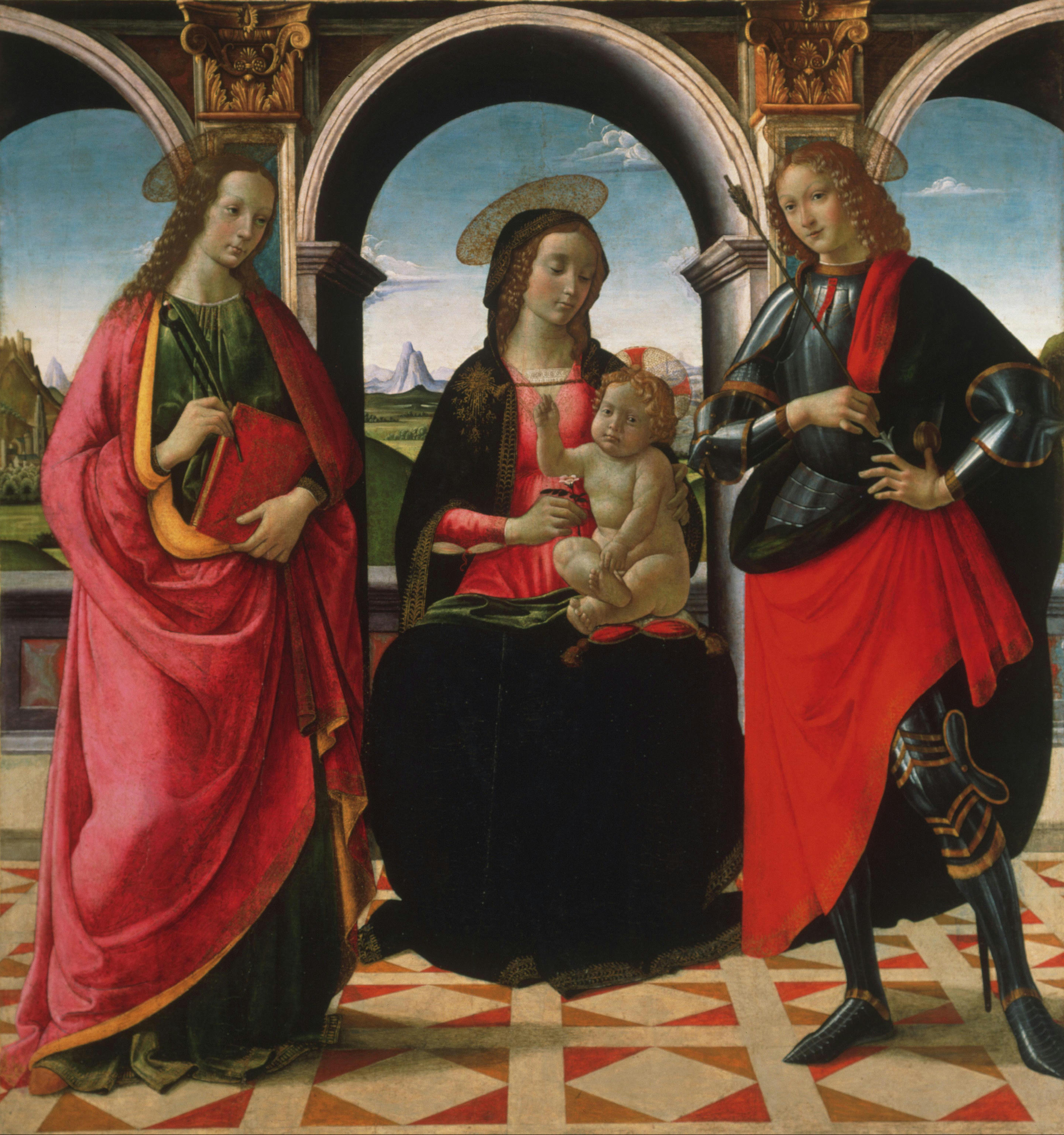
The Virgin and Child with Saints Apollonia and Sebastian, tempera on panel painting by Davide Ghirlandaio, 1490s, Philadelphia Museum of Art.

Davide Ghirlandaio (1452–1525), also known as David Ghirlandaio and as Davide Bigordi, was an Italian painter and mosaicist, active in his native Florence.

His brothers Benedetto Ghirlandaio (1458–1497) and Domenico Ghirlandaio (1449–1494) were both painters, as was his nephew Ridolfo Ghirlandaio (1483–1561). Davide was an assistant to, and then a partner of, his brother, the leading painter Domenico. After Domenico's death, Davide took over the studio and trained Domenico's son Ridolfo. He was active in the mosaic decoration of the Orvieto Cathedral.
