= Joseph Goedenhuyze =

Italian botanist of Flemish origins

- Portrait of Joseph Goedenhuyze by Daniel Fröschl, Pisa Botanic Garden and Museum
- Born: c. 1550; Spanish Netherlands
- Died: 1595; Florence, Grand Duchy of Tuscany
- Other names: Giuseppe Casabona; Giuseppe Benincasa
- Occupations: Botanist and naturalist
- Scientific career
- Workplaces: Orto Botanico di Firenze; Orto botanico di Pisa

Joseph Goedenhuyze or Goedenhuize (died late 1595) was a Flemish botanist and naturalist, active in the court of the Grand Duchy of Tuscany. He was also known by the Italian name Giuseppe Casabona or more rarely Giuseppe Benincasa.

== Life ==
He was born in Flanders, probably in the mid 16th century, but soon moved to Florence, probably as a teenager. His parentage and education are unknown but the latter does not seem to have extended much beyond that of a herbalist. Probably around 1570 he entered Niccolò Gaddi's service – Gaddi had built a major botanical garden in the grounds of his palazzo, to which Goedenhuyze brought back plants from Livorno, Monte Pisano and Barga. In 1578 or possibly earlier, Gaddi's influence at court gained Goedenhuyze a role in the court of Francesco I, as one of the gardeners in his Giardino Delle Stalle and Giardino dei Semplici and the garden at his casino di San Marco. He travelled widely to bring back new plants for the gardens, sending letters back to the grand dukes and to his scientist friends. In summer-autumn 1578 he went searching for plants in the Apuan Alps, getting as far as Liguria and Piedmont and between May and June 1579 he visited Grosseto, the Argentario, Piombino and the island of Elba, returning to the Apuan Alps near Seravezza. In spring 1581 he collected plants in the territories of Padua, Bassano and Vicenza, finishing up at Trentino. In early summer 1583 he set off from Garfagnana, crossing the mountains around Parma and reaching the Euganean Hills and monte Summano near Vicenza – that August he visited the gardens in Padua and Venice.

In his final years Francesco I began to neglect his gardens in favour of his art collections and the sciences and Goedenhuyze suffered, complaining about his low salary and small purchase funds. Francesco I died in October 1587 and his successor Ferdinando I confirmed Goedenhuyze's post, increased his salary and assigned him a larger plot in Florence to plant his garden. Around this time Goedenhuyze made contact with botanists and scientists across Italy and Europe, such as Ulisse Aldrovandi, Gian Vincenzo Pinelli, Carolus Clusius (director of the botanical gardens in Leiden) and Joachim Camerarius the Younger. Ferdinand recommended him to Leonardo Valmarana, Count of Vicenza and to Girolamo Cappello, brother of the dowager grand-duchess Bianca. Thanks to this recommendation he returned to Padua in summer 1588 and from there began a long journey through the Republic of Venice's territories, including the monti Lessini, monte Summano, Rosà (where he was a guest of Capello's), Bassano, Cividale del Friuli, Fiera di Primiero and Agordo). The journey culminated in a climb of monte Baldo, though the local peasants thought Goedenhuyze was a necromancer and so count Agostino Giusti (godfather of the guardian of Verona) had to provide him with an armed escort. In the meantime some grand-ducal officials were trying to eject him from his lodgings at the Casino di San Marco and so he had to write back from Cividale to Florence to frustrate their plans.

In 1589 Goedenhuyze was elected chamberlain of the Compagnia di S. Barbara dei Fiamminghi in Florence and in October that year he travelled to Venice in an attempt to sail to Crete – the attempt failed but he still managed to use the trip study herbs in Verona and Mantua. As shown in a letter of Clusius, in April 1590 he was in Pisa to work in its old botanical garden, then headed by Lorenzo Mazzanga da Barga. In July and August that year he visited the mountains in Liguria as well as Munich and Nice and in late summer 1590 he made another attempt to visit Crete. He was unable to join Camerarius' nephew Joachim Jungermann on his voyage out, but on 17 September managed to embark on a galley commanded by Girolamo Cappello, who had been appointed governor of Crete. He explored the coasts of Istria, Dalmatia and Albania en route before finally landing at Candia on 22 November. Goedenhuyze explored the whole island for almost a year, collecting plants and commissioning drawings of some of them from Georg Dyckman, a German soldier in the Venetian army – thirty-five of Dyckman's images are now in the university library in Pisa, copies by Aldrovandi of seventeen more in the university library in Bologna. Goedenhuyze also wrote back to Ferdinand, Clusius, the duke of Mantua, Aldrovandi and Ferdinand's secretary Belisario Vinta.

Goedenhuyze returned to Venice in early November 1591 and went immediately from there to Florence, with major health concerns but also anxious to resume work on the gardens there, which had been looked after by his brother-in-law Giulio Marucelli in his absence. Goedenhuyze was appointed prefect of the Medici's botanical garden in Pisa and arrived there early in 1592, leading the transfer of plants from its old site at the Santa Maria convent to a new one on Via Santa Maria – the work took until at least 1595 and possibly longer. In autumn 1595 he travelled to Corsica but this final effort seems to have worn him out and he died late that year. His widow sold his small collection of minerals, animals and zoological and botanical drawings to the grand duke in February 1596. He was succeeded at the garden in Pisa by Francesco Malocchi, who continued to collaborate with Goedenhuyze's son Francesco.

== Bibliography ==
- Olmi, G. (1991). ""Molti amici in varij luoghi": studio della natura e rapporti epistolari nel secolo XVI". Nuncius. Annali di storia della scienza. VI: 3–31.
- Bacchelli, Franco (2001). "GOEDENHUYZE, Joseph". Dizionario Biografico degli Italiani (in Italian). Vol. 57: Giulini–Gonzaga. Rome: Institute of the Italian Encyclopaedia. ISBN 978-88-12-00032-6.
- Olmi, G. (2015). "Un «simplicista» fiammingo alla corte dei Medici: note su Giuseppe Casabona «servitore de virtuosi»". In M. Bucchi; L. Ciancio; A. Dröscher (eds.). L’esperimento della storia. Saggi in onore di Renato G. Mazzolini. Trento: Fondazione Museo storico del Trentino. pp. 13–26. ISBN 978-8871971988.
