= Orto Botanico dell'Università di Bologna =

Botanical garden in Bologna, Italy

orto botanico dell'Università di Bologna
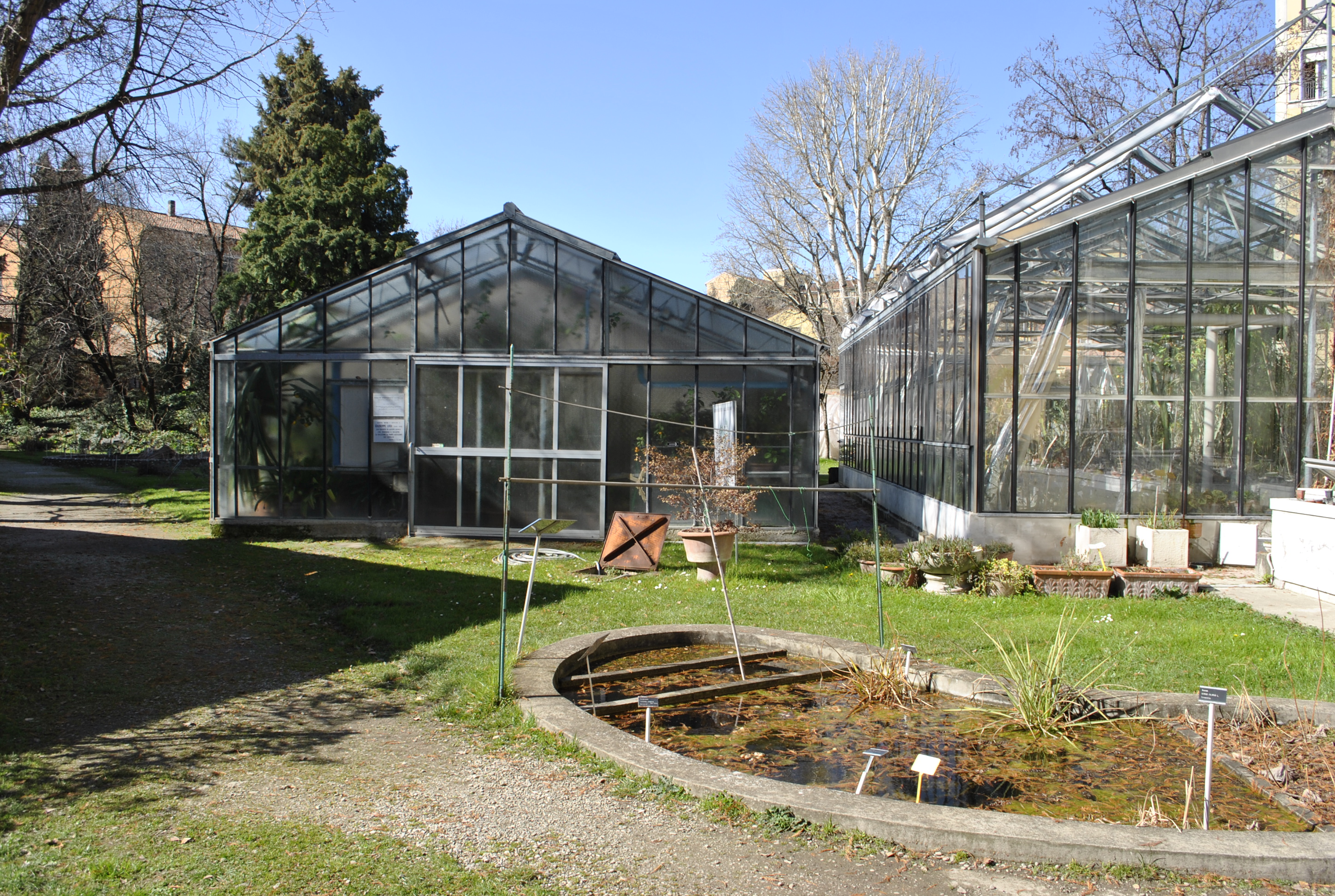
- Location: San Vitale, Italy
- Coordinates: 44°29′58″N 11°21′11″E
- Type: botanical garden
- Website: sma.unibo.it/it/il-sistema-museale/orto-botanico-ed-erbario
- Location of Orto Botanico dell'Università di Bologna

The Orto Botanico dell'Università di Bologna, also known as the Orto Botanico di Bologna, is a botanical garden operated by the University of Bologna. It is located at Via Irnerio, 42, 40126 Bologna, Italy, and open daily except Mondays.

Established in 1568, the garden is one of Europe's oldest, after those of Pisa, Padua, and Florence. Although early records indicate a Bolognese medicinal herb garden dating to 1365, today's garden arose from the proposals of botanist Luca Ghini (1490-1556), who left to create the Orto botanico di Pisa, and became a reality under his successor Ulisse Aldrovandi (1522-1605). Those first gardens were located in the Palazzo Pubblico, in a courtyard near today's Sala Borsa, but partially moved in 1587 to a larger site in Borghetto S. Giuliano (today's Porta S. Stefano), with an area of about 5000 m^{2}. By 1653 the garden's catalog listed approximately 1500 species.

In 1740 the garden moved to Porta S. Stefano, followed in 1745 by the construction of a hybernaculum, where exotic plants were kept during the winter. Neoclassical greenhouses were added in 1765, to designs by Francesco Tadolini, and still stand in Via San Giuliano. In 1803 the garden moved again to its current location. The garden suffered a period of severe neglect in the early 1900s, and indeed was covered with a dense natural forest, and bombing in 1944 destroyed the garden's Napoleonic-era orangerie. Since the end of World War II, however, the garden has gradually been restored.

Today's garden contains about 5,000 specimens representing 1200 taxa. Its site is roughly rectangular, about 2 hectares in extent, with the following major features:

- Front garden - primarily trees, including Albizia julibrissin, Ginkgo biloba, Ilex aquifolium, Liriodendron tulipifera, Metasequoia glyptostroboides, as well as Musa basjoo, Phyllostachys viridis, and a fountain.
- Rear garden - reconstruction of a typical local hardwood forest, with greenhouses, Orto dei Semplici, thematic collections (including those of alpine plants and carnivorous plants), and the forest.
- Forest - Carex pendula, Corylus avellana, Equisetum telmateia, Hedera helix, Lonicera xylosteum, Populus alba, Salix purpurea, Sambucus nigra, etc.
- Pond / wetlands
- Tropical greenhouses - bromeliaceae and orchids, coffee, palm trees, spice and medicinal plants, and plants of economic interest
- Succulent plant greenhouse - approximately 5000 succulent specimens from Central and South America, Africa, Madagascar, and the Canary Islands.
- Carnivorous plant greenhouse - carnivorous plants from the genera Drosera, Pinguicula, and Utricularia.
- Orto dei Semplici - a traditional herb garden, arranged by the plants' most common uses.

== Gallery of Images ==
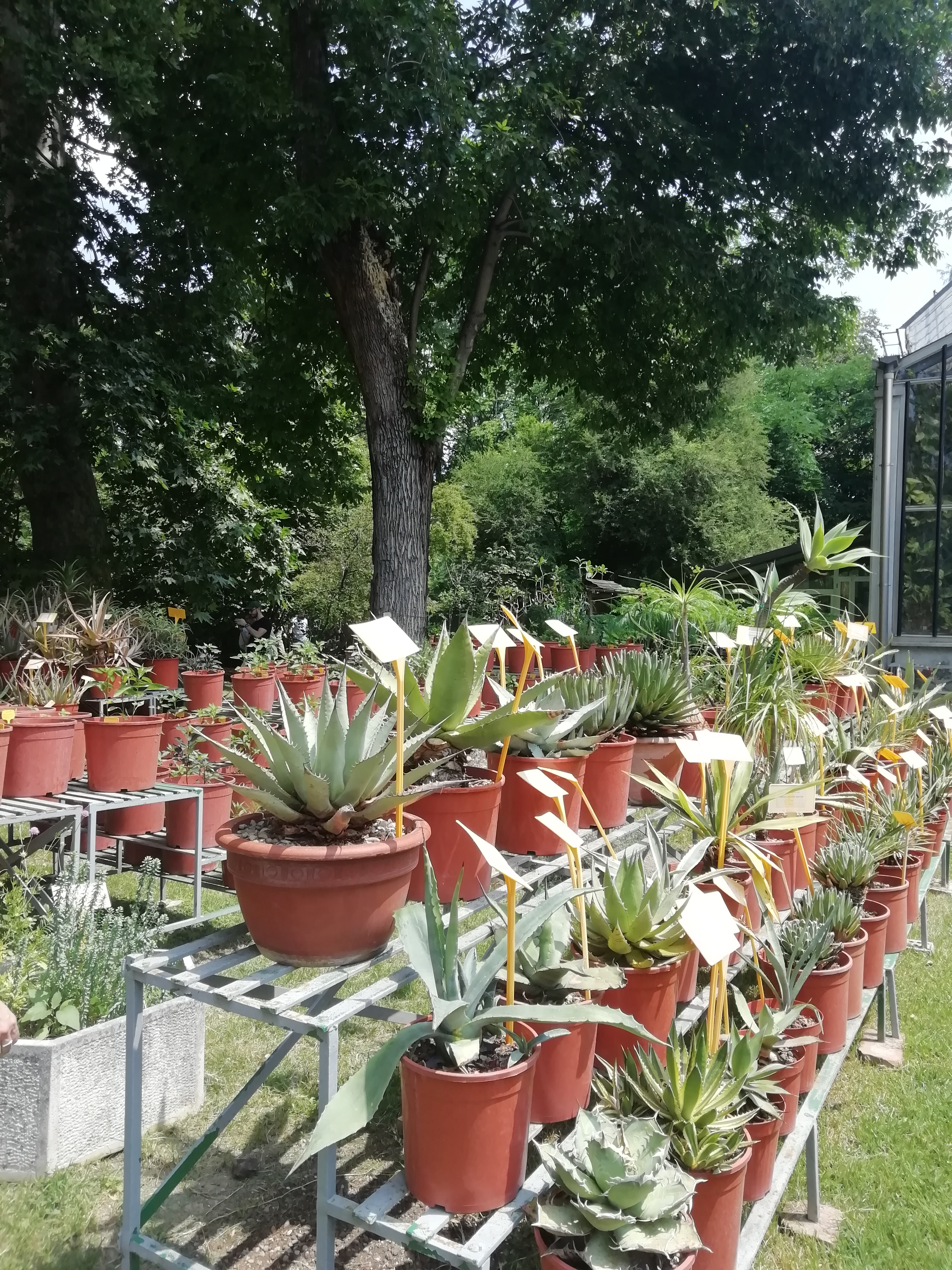

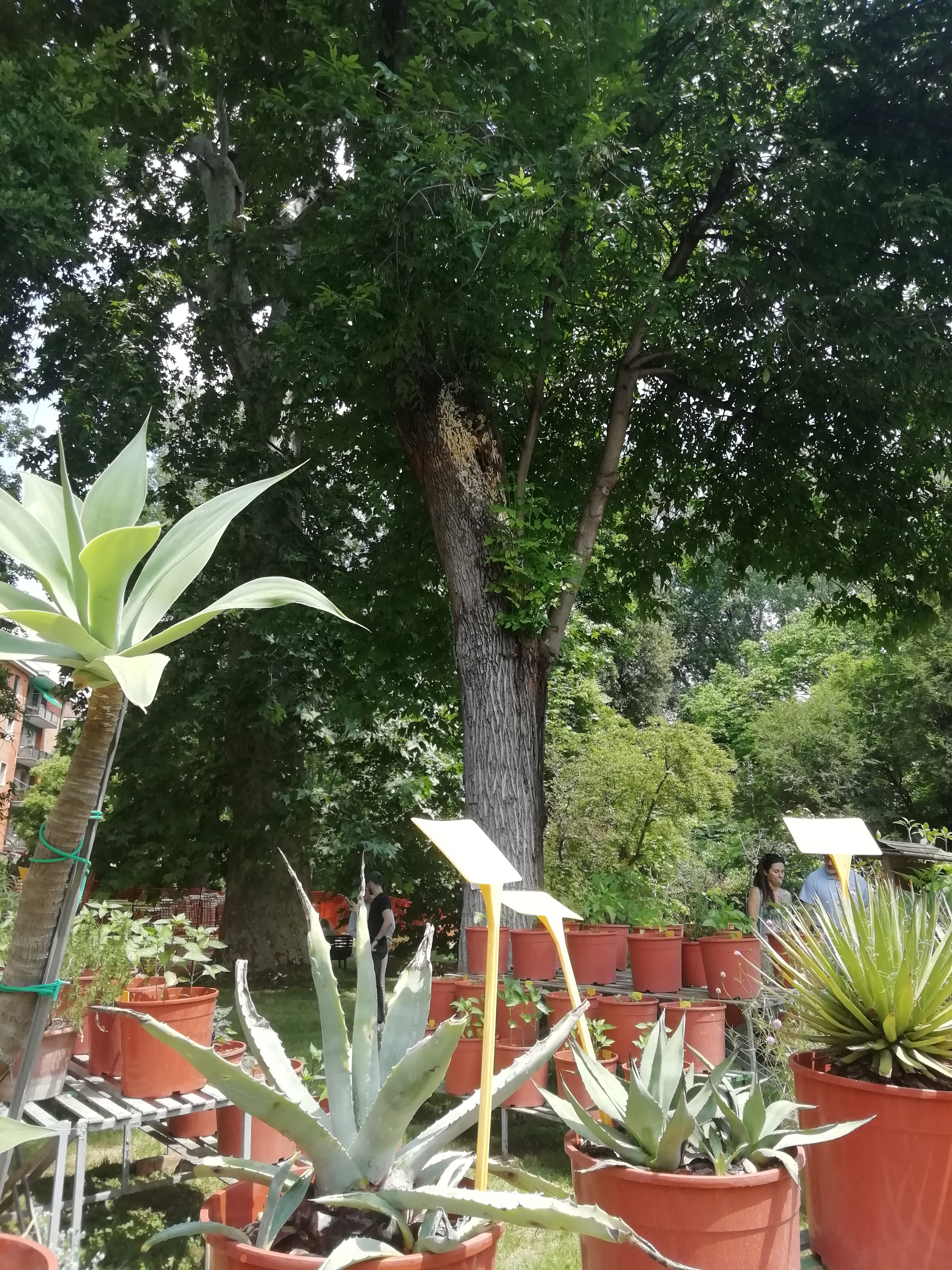

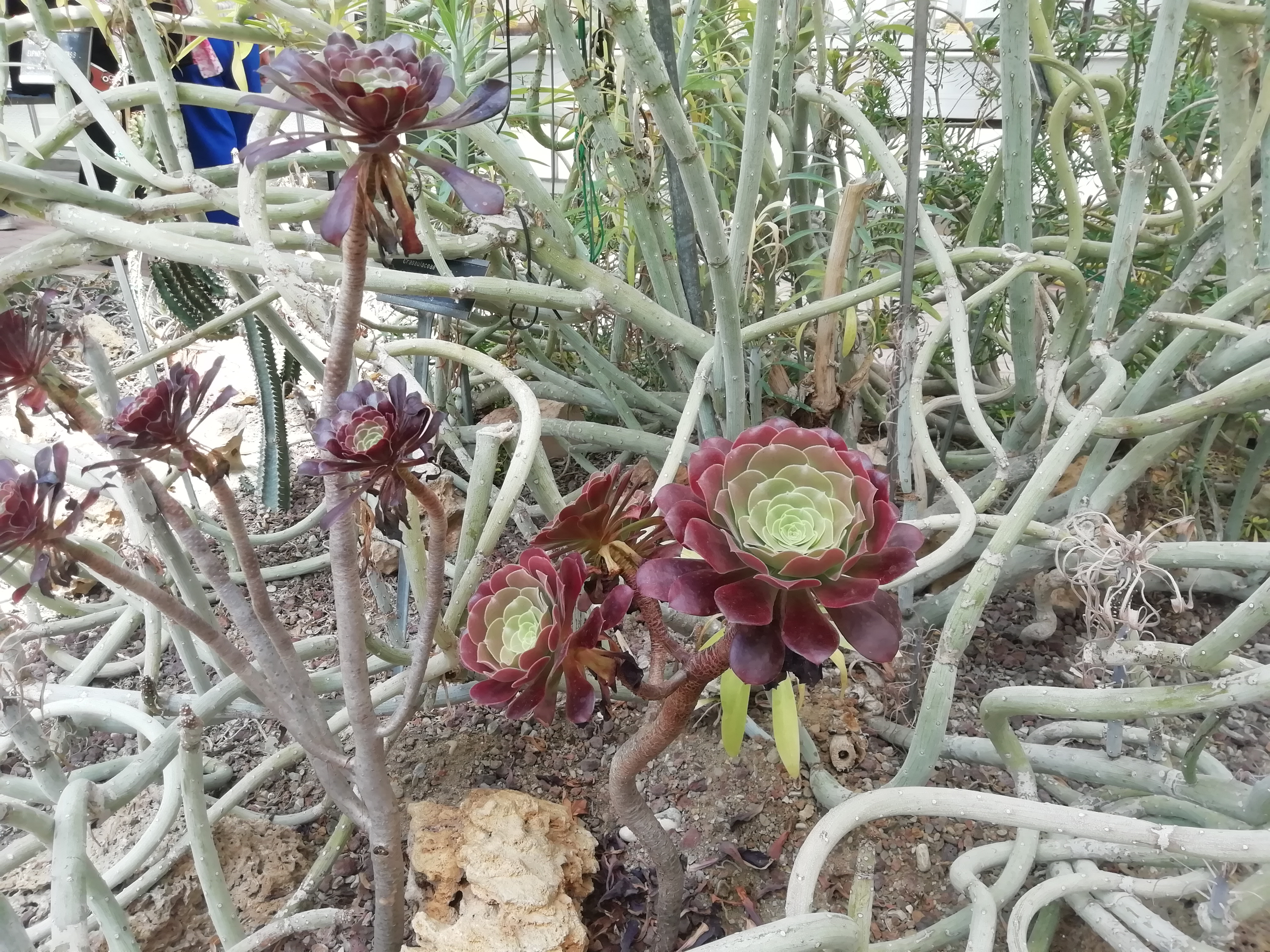

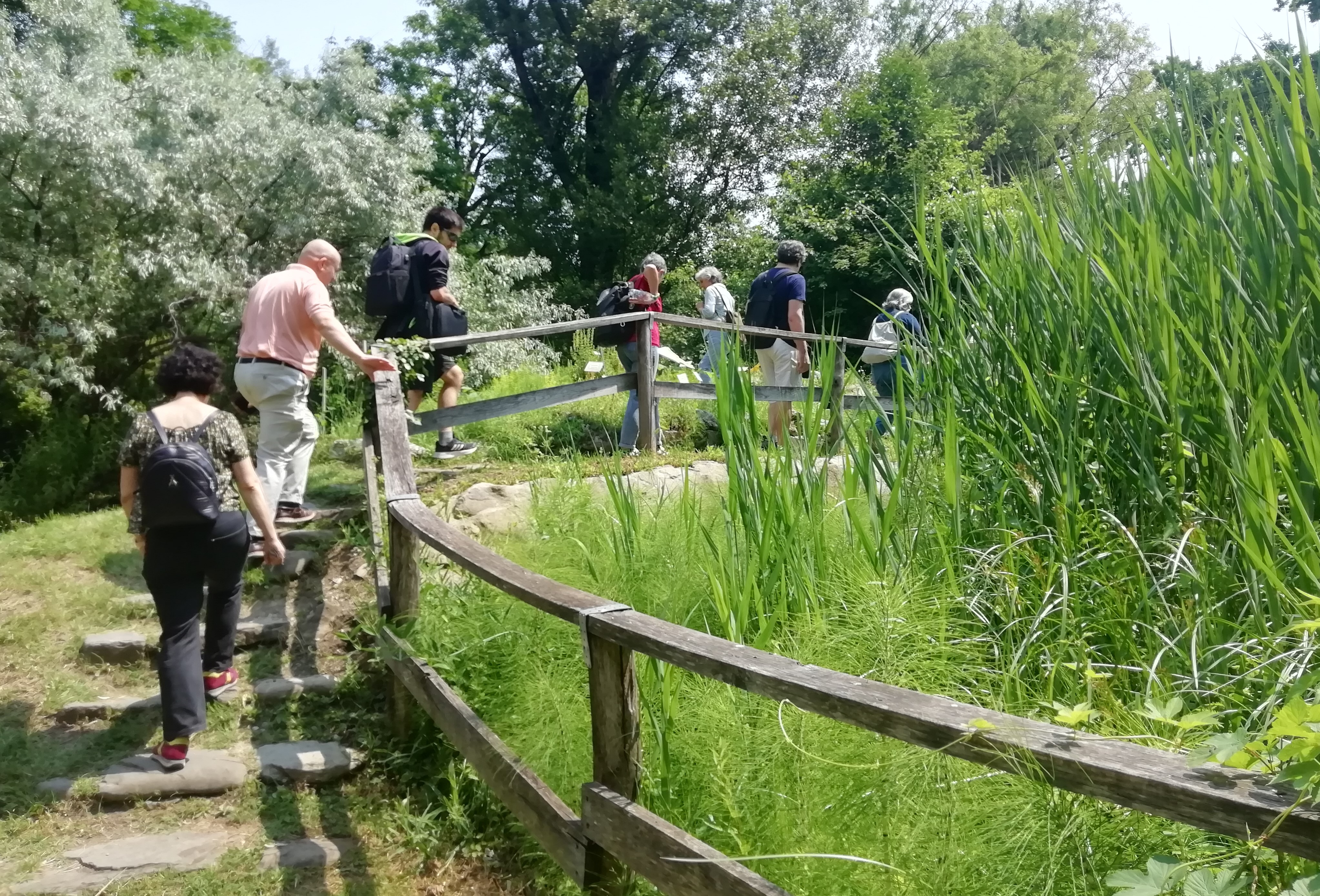

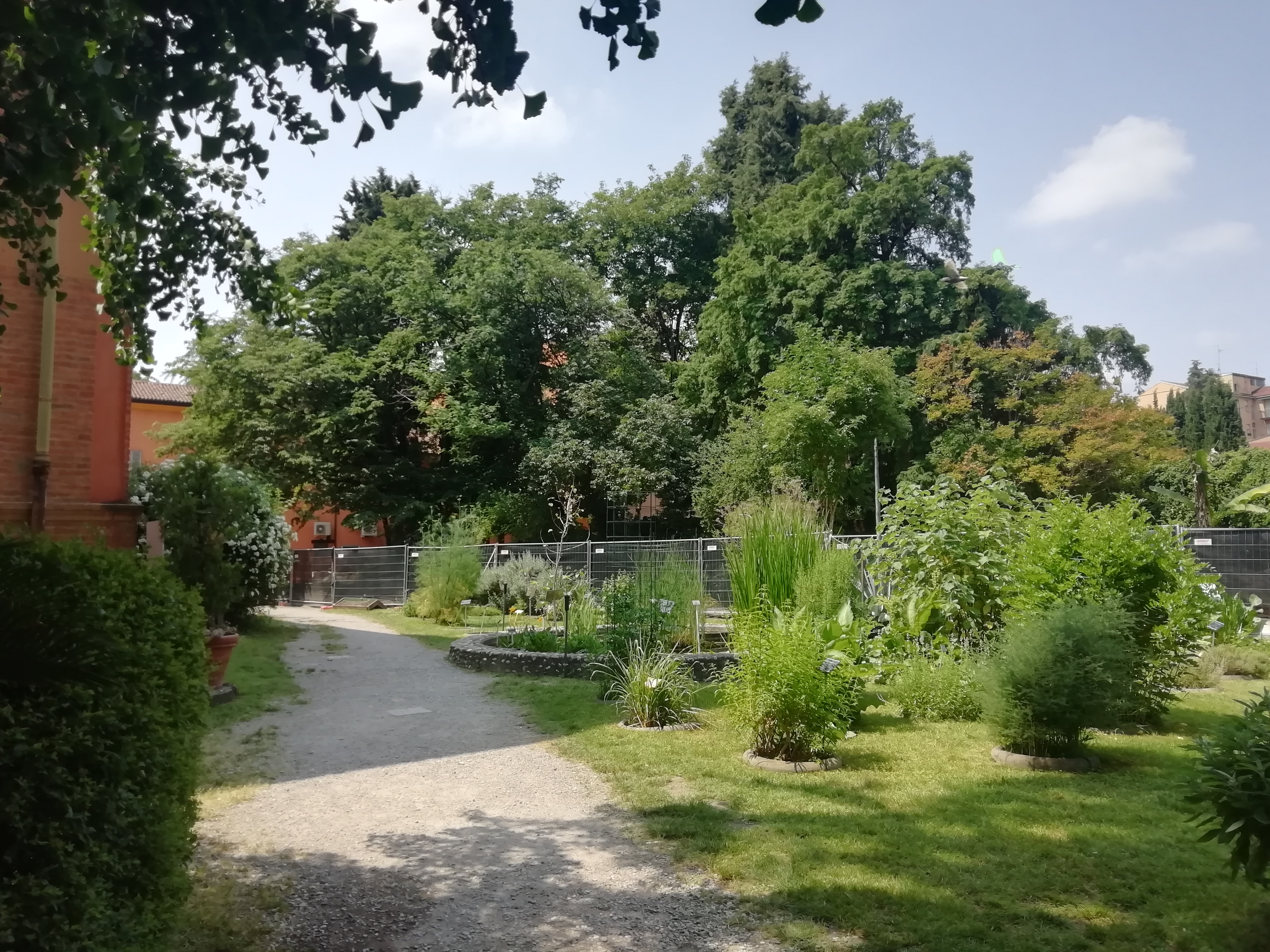
Herb garden

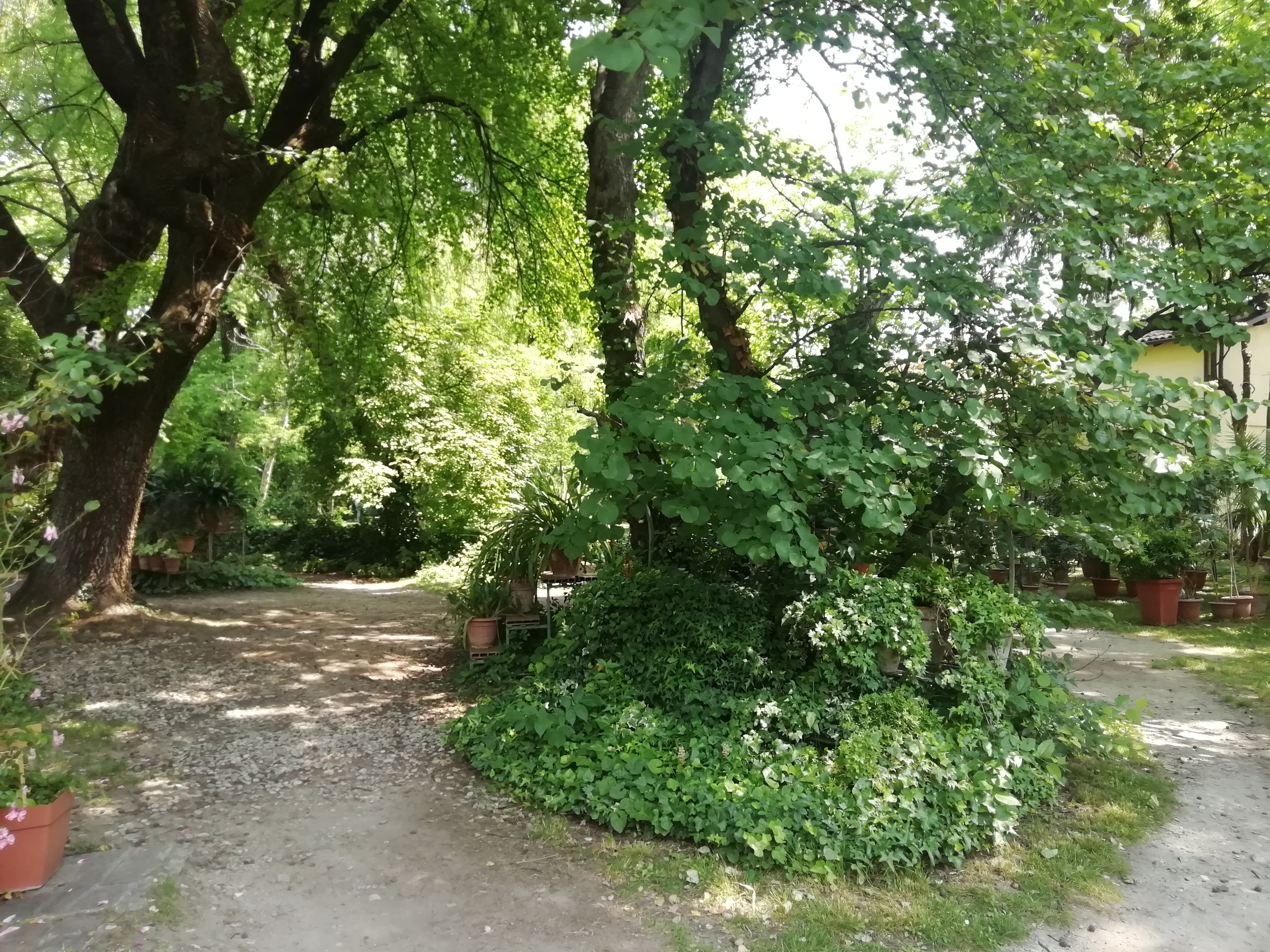

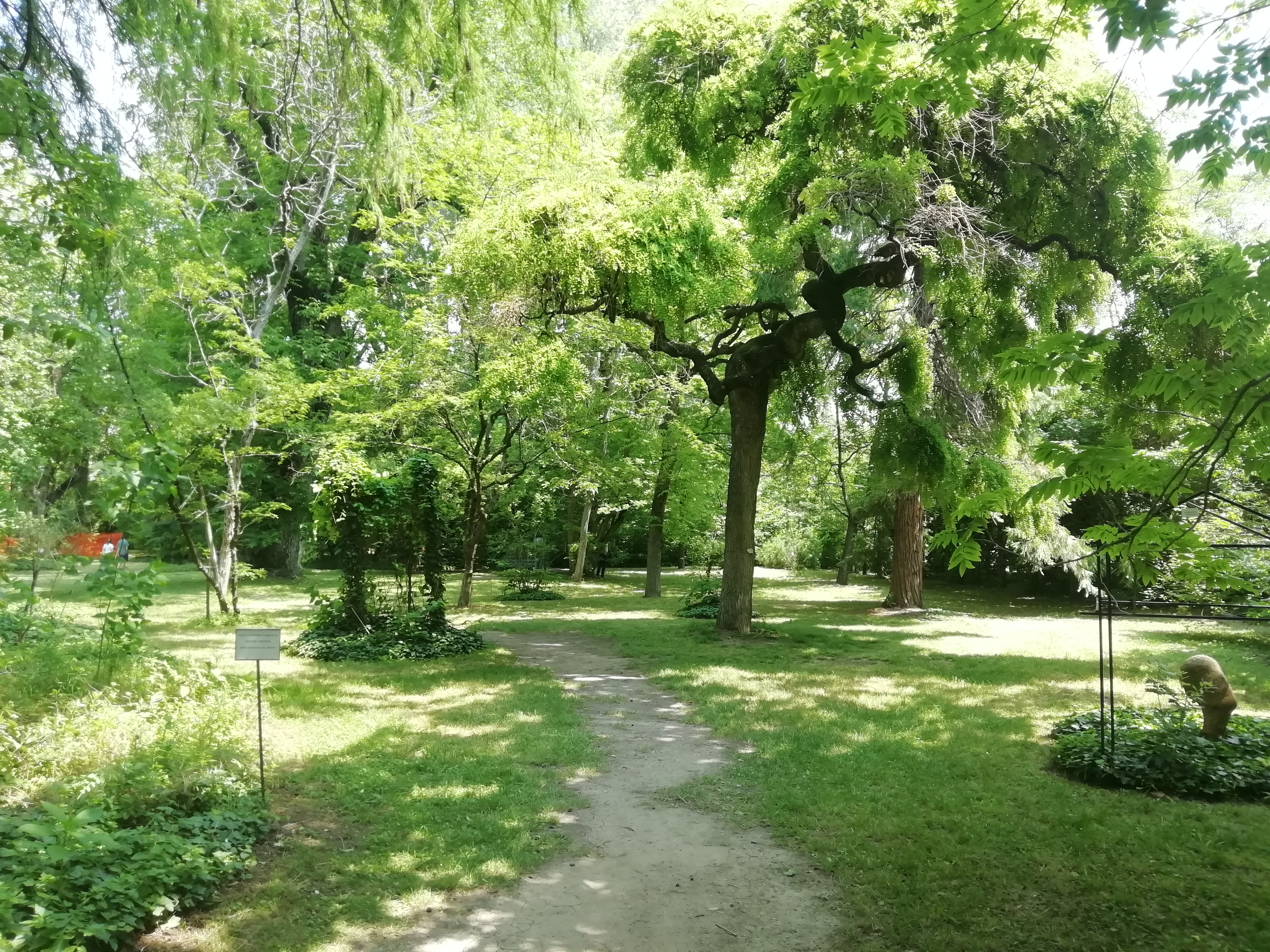

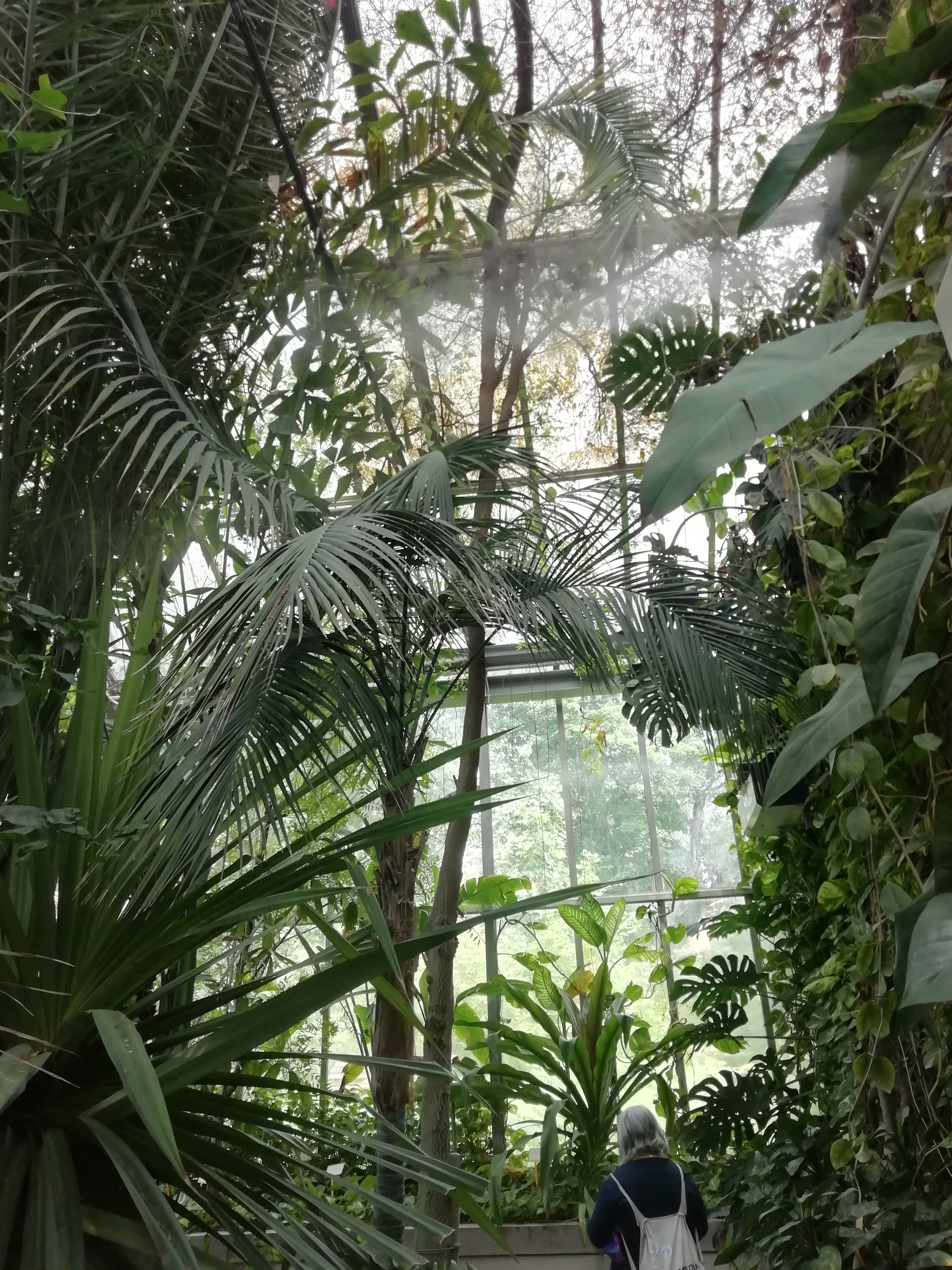
Tropic-->al Greenhouse

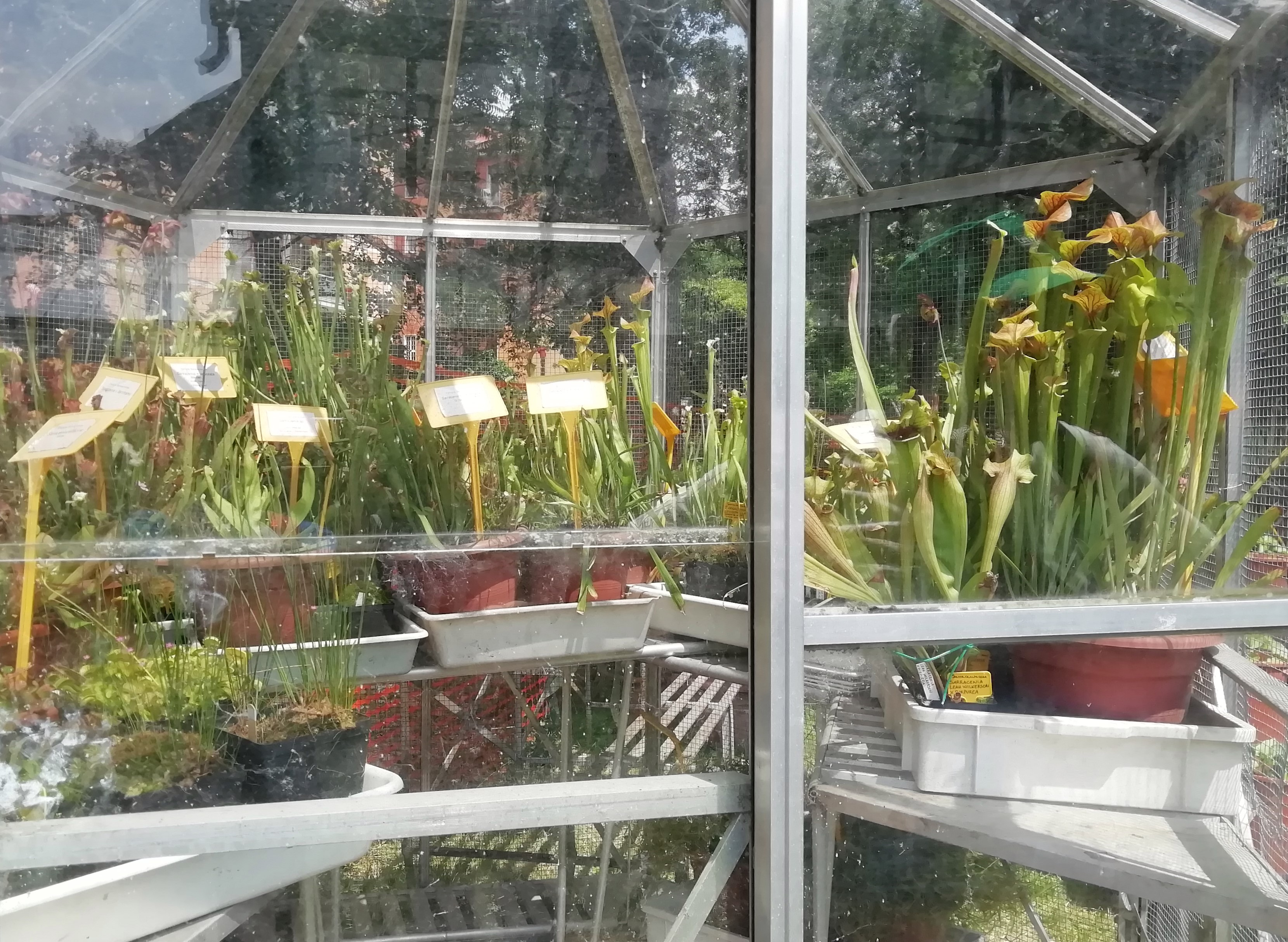
Carnivorous Plant Greenhouse

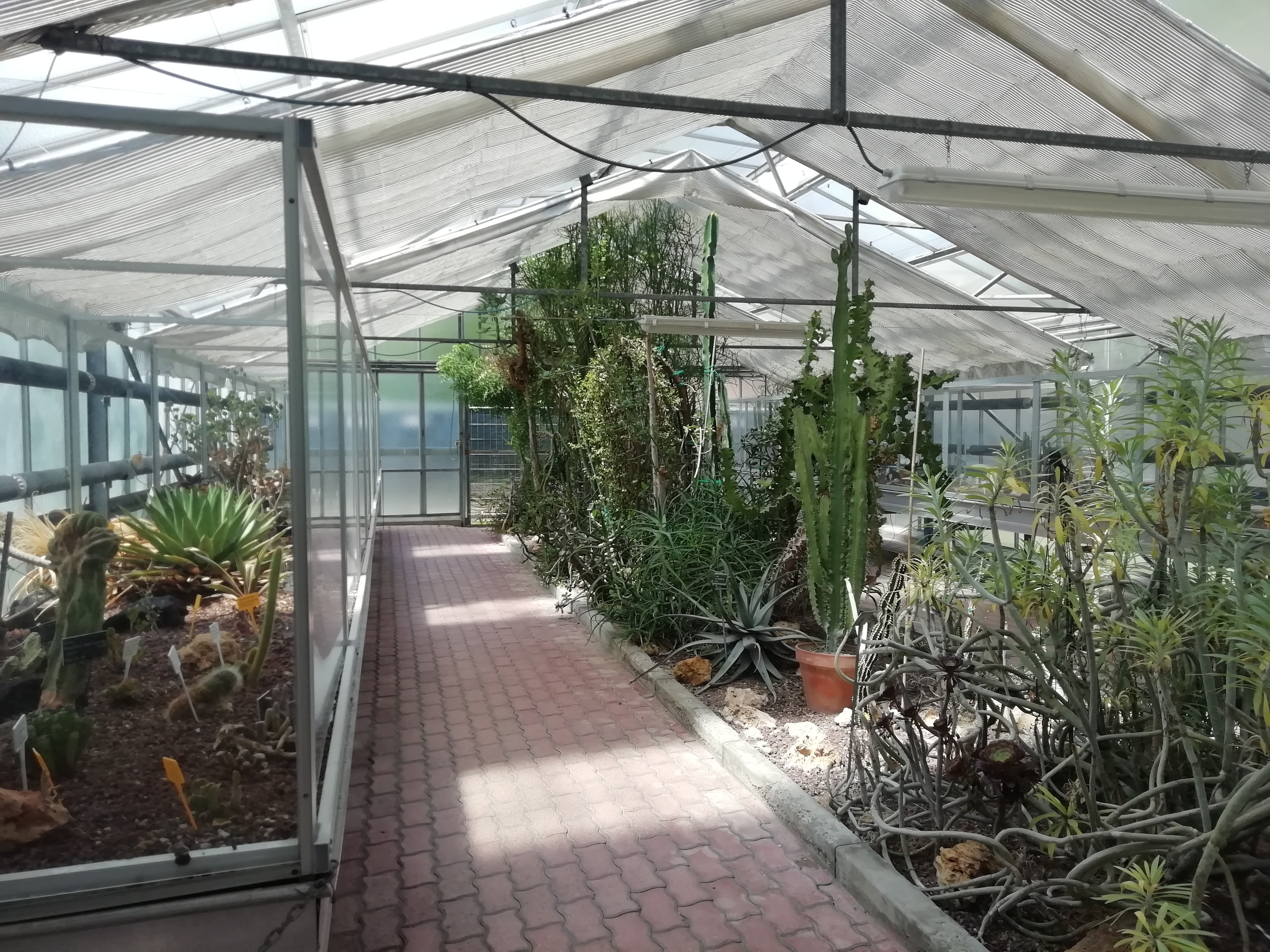
Succulent Plant Greenhouse "Giuseppe Lodi"

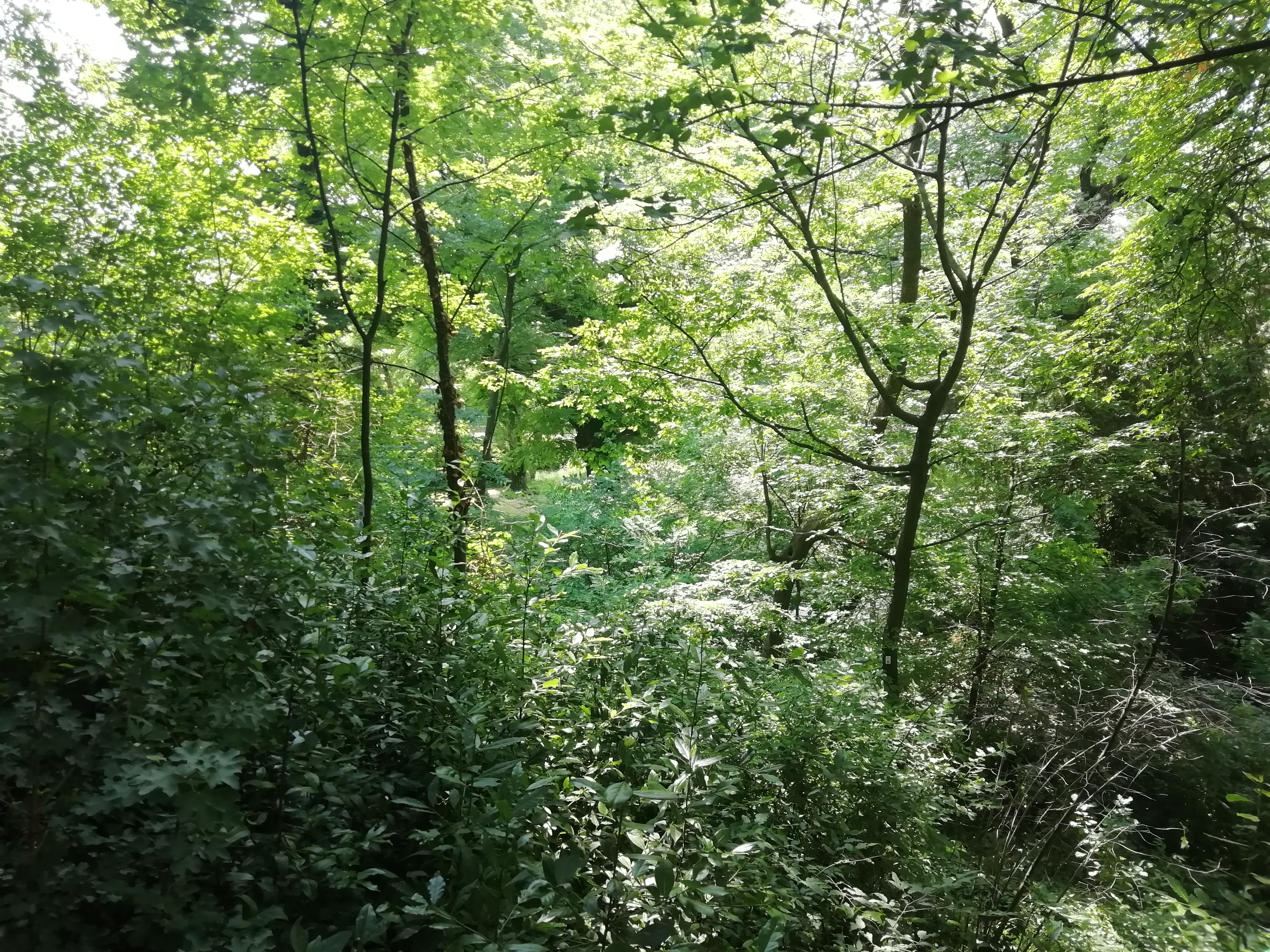
The forest

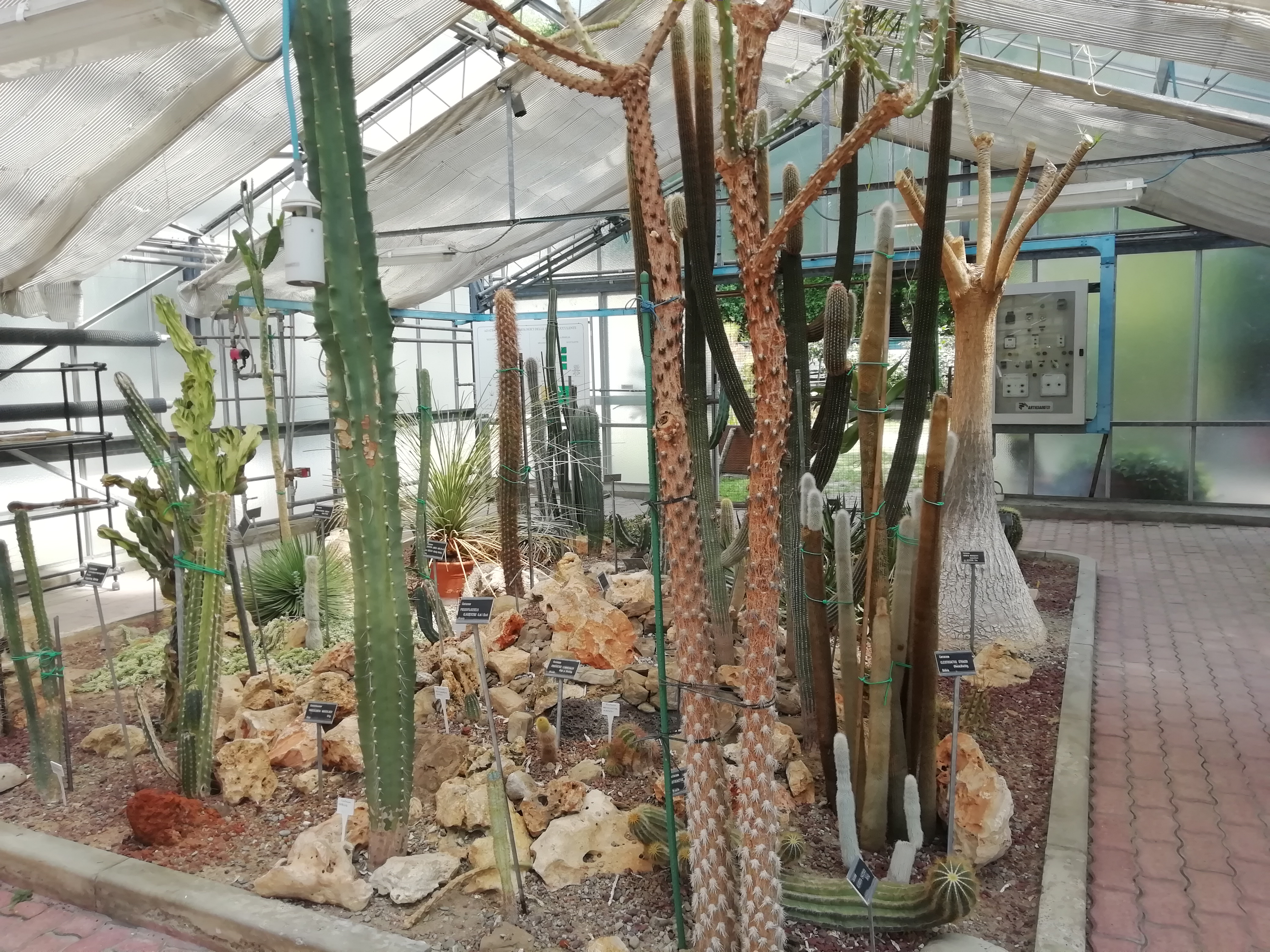
Cactuses

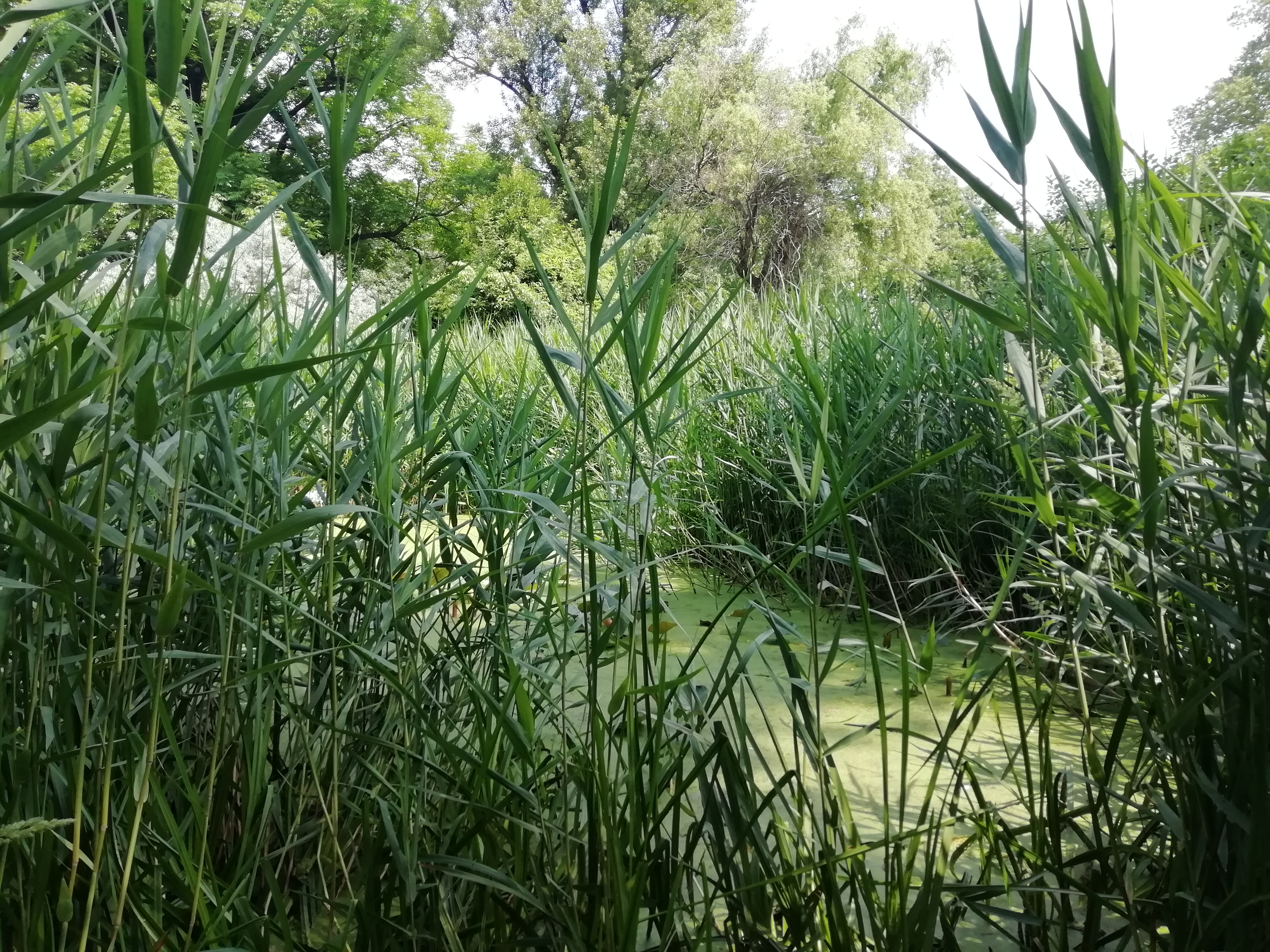
The pond

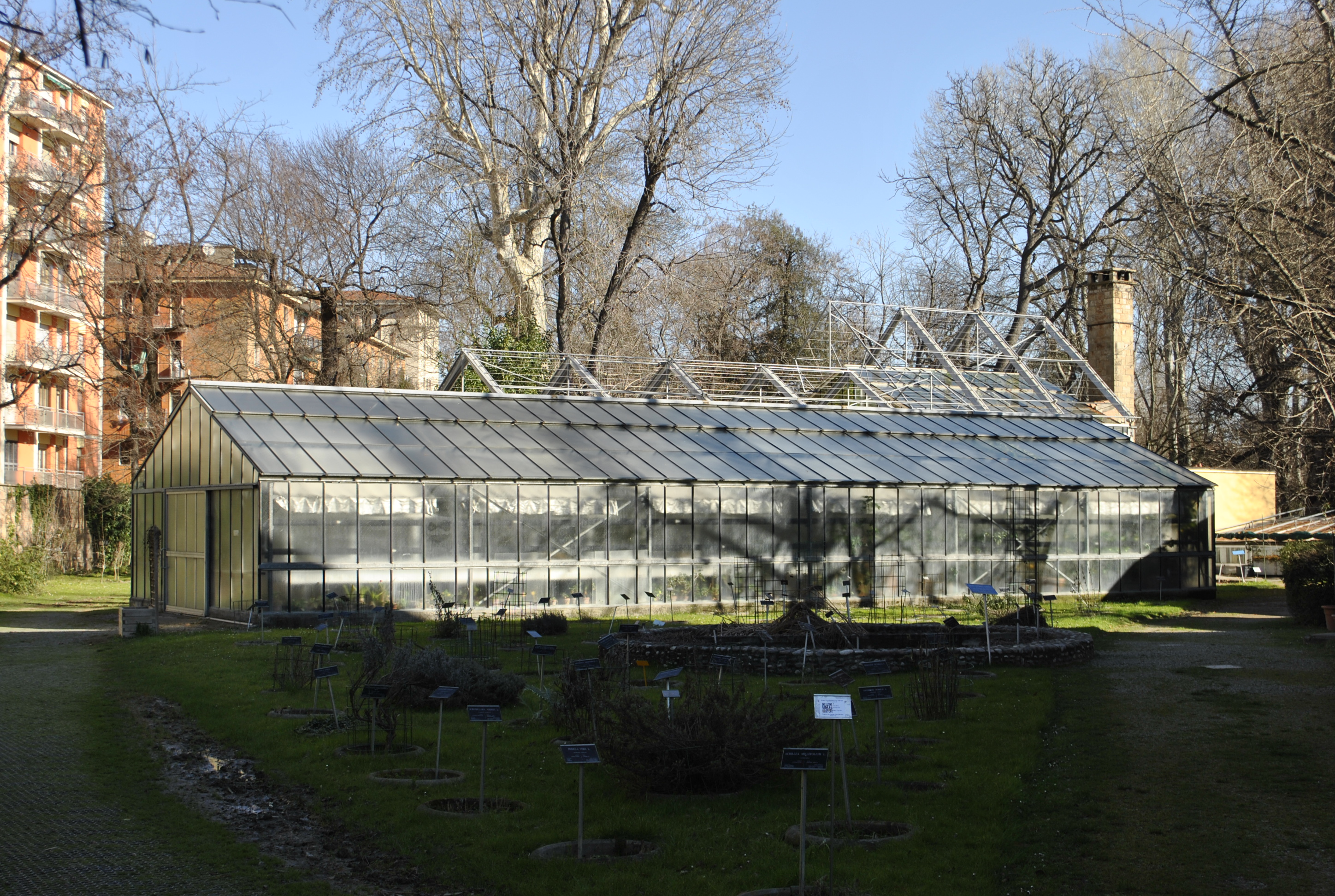
A greenhouse

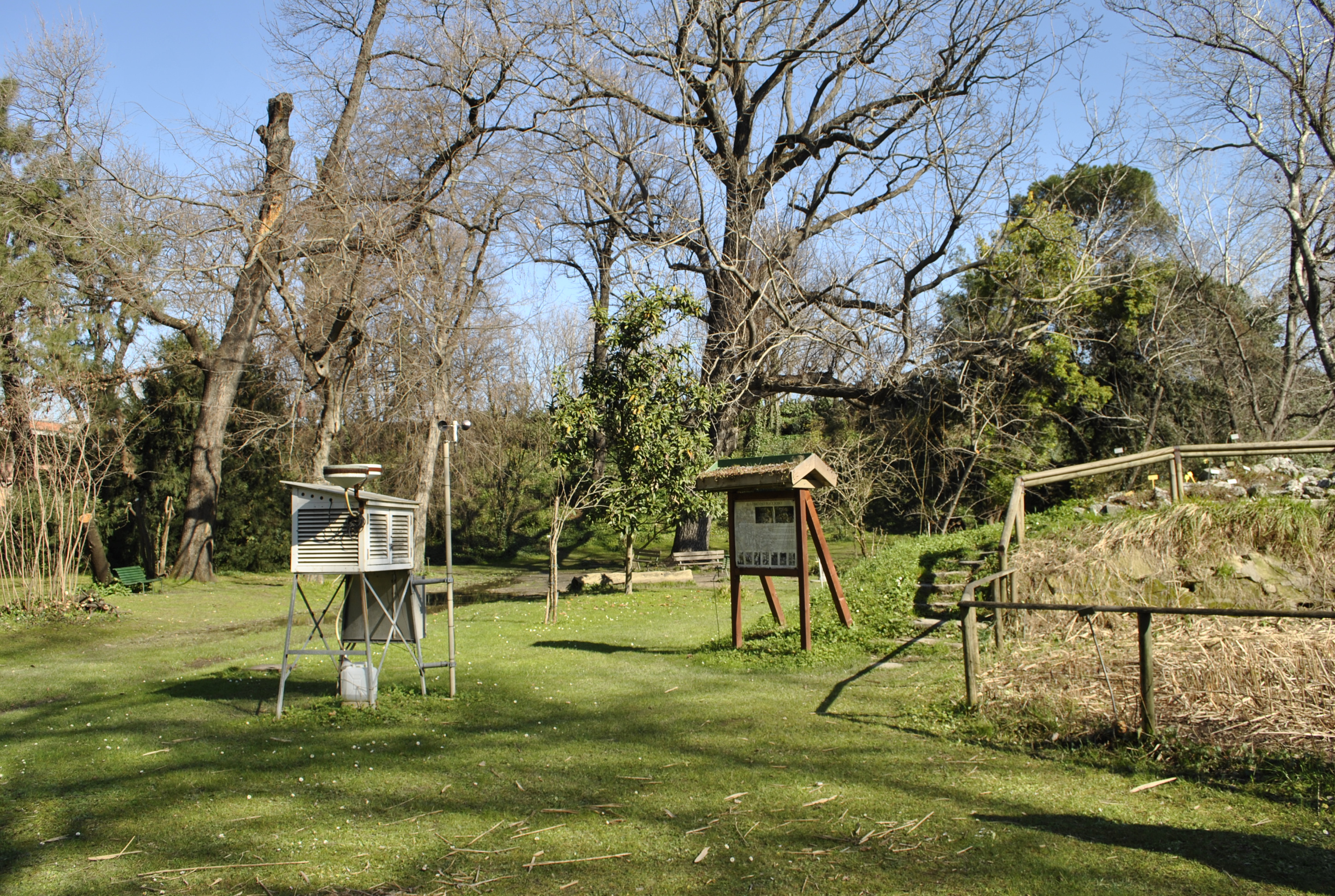
Information Panel & Rock Garden

== See also ==
- List of botanical gardens in Italy
