= Vasari (surname) =

Vasari is an Italian surname. Notable people with the surname include:

- Gaetano Vasari (born 1970), Italian footballer
- Giorgio Vasari (1511–1574), Italian painter
- Lazzaro Vasari (1399–1468), Italian painter

== See also ==
- Thomas Vásári (died after 1381), Hungarian nobleman in the 14th century
