= Libro de' Disegni =

Collection of drawings, collected by Giorgio Vasari

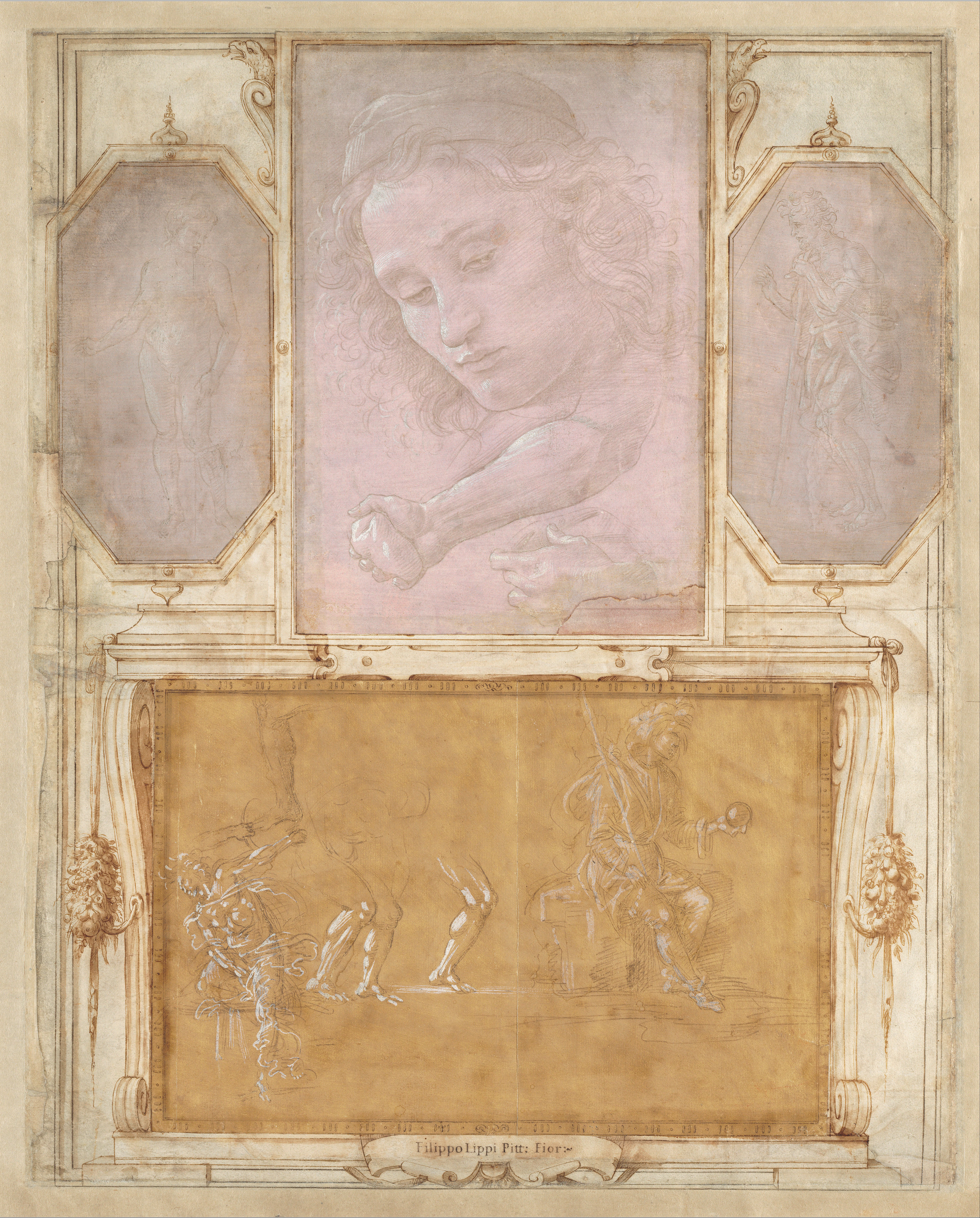
Libro de' Disegni Filippino Lippi, Botticelli, and Raffaellino del Garbo National Gallery of Art

The Libro de' Disegni (Italian for Book of Drawings) was a collection of drawings gathered, sorted, and grouped by Giorgio Vasari whilst writing his Lives of the Most Excellent Painters, Sculptors, and Architects. By the time of his death in 1574 it is thought to have contained around 526 drawings, of which 162 are now in the Louvre and 83 in the Nationalmuseum, Stockholm. There are also drawings from the Libro in the prints and drawings departments of the Uffizi, the British Museum, the Albertina, the National Gallery of Art and other institutions.

== Origins and dispersal ==
Some art historians believe they were gathered to illustrate Vasari's Lives directly, as a visual index of the artists' works, whilst others believe it was a separate document in its own right. In his preface to the Lives, Vasari described his reasons for writing:

When I took on the task of writing about the life of the great artists ... I made a choice, which I have also explained, between what was good, what was better and what was perfect. I carefully pointed out the techniques, aspects, styles, particularities and fantasies of painters and sculptors. I also tried my best to reveal to those who did not succeed alone the causes and origins of different styles, and the ascending or descending curve followed by arts in different epoques and among different characters

No text reveals why Vasari compiled his collection of drawings, but it was probably to illustrate the styles of the different artists he wrote about and to show how he had divided them "into three parts, or rather let us call them periods, between the rebirth of the arts and our own time - each of these is distinguished from the others by manifest differences". The earliest drawing in the collection was by Cimabue and the latest dated to Vasari's own time. In the 1550 and 1568 editions of the Lives Vasari insisted on drawings as documents which allowed the viewer to perceive the maniera of the great masters of painting and mentioned when he owned one or two drawings by a particular artist, such as at the end of his life of Filippo Lippi: ("Fra Filippo drew very well, as one can see in my own Libro of the most famous painters, in the preparatory drawings for the altarpiece at Santo Spirito and the frescoes in the Prato chapel.") and in his life of Sandro Botticelli ("Sandro's drawings were of a totally unique excellence; and, after his death, more and more artists have been keen to have some of his drawings; and I myself, in my collection, have a few which were done with great care and judgement").

Giorgio Vasari was one of the founders of the Accademia delle Arti del Disegno set up in Florence by Cosimo I of Tuscany in 1563. He and the other founders wished to use this academy to promote artists above the status of artisans. He was also a passionate collector of drawings and in his Libro he set them in his own paper frames and gathered drawings by one or more painters on a single sheet. In 1528 he received a collection of Lorenzo Ghiberti's drawings, as one of Ghiberti's descendants.

After Vasari's death, the sheets of the Libro were initially bought in 1574 by the Florentine collector Niccolò Gaddi (1537-1591). They were then sold by Gaddi's heirs before 18 May 1638, the date of death of Lorenzo Sabbatini, who had been put in charge of the Libro. They were then dispersed among the Medici, Arundel, Quesnel, Crozat and Mariette collections during the 17th and 18th centuries.

== Collections ==
=== European collections ===
==== Albertina ====
Albertina, Vienna
Artist	Subject	Inventory Number	Acquired from	Online
Bezzi Giovanni Francesco	Standing male figure	2000	Teschen 1822	Entry
Carpaccio Vittore	Study of three standing men The "Cavaliere della Scalza" seen from behind, with a young boy in profile.	1456r 1456v.	Teschen 1822; Teschen 1822	Entry Entry.
Garbo Raffaellino	Studies of hands Profile of a young woman.	4858 17620.	Teschen 1822; Teschen 1822	Entry Entry.
Ghirlandaio Davide	Standing draped man	39	Teschen 1822	Entry
Ghirlandaio Domenico	Christ blessing, surrounded by angels	511	Teschen 1822	Entry
Granacci Francesco	Study of heads	14179	Teschen 1822	Entry
Liberale da Verona	Two studies of women	17617	Teschen 1822	Entry
Lippi Filippo	Kneeling angel	41	Teschen 2623	Entry
Mazzola Francesco	Self portrait in an ornamental frame	33	Teschen 2623	Entry
Orsi Lelio	Jesus in the Temple	581	Teschen 2623	Entry
Porta Bartolomeo della	Two studies of a standing man	4875	Teschen 1822	Entry
Primaticcio Francesco	Self-portrait as an old man	1965	Teschen 1822	Entry
Ramenghi Giovanni Battista	Mystic Marriage of St Catherine	2006	Teschen 1822	Entry
Uccello Paolo	Portrait of Leonardo Bruni in profile	46	Teschen 1822	Entry
Vasari Lazzaro	Two men dressed in eastern costume	33	Teschen 1822	Entry
Vinci Leonardo da	Study of heads	14179	Teschen 1822	Entry
Anonymous Italian painter, 15th century	A bishop	13128	Teschen 1822	Entry
Anonymous Italian painter, 15th century	Study of a nude young man seen from behind	12r	Teschen 1822	Entry
Anonymous Italian painter, 15th century	Tomb of pope Sixtus IV	21	Teschen 1822	Entry
Anonymous Italian painter, 15th century	Two standing men	22r	Teschen 1822	Entry
Anonymous Italian painter, 15th century	Two standing men	22v	Teschen 1822	Entry
Anonymous Italian painter, 15th century	One man seated, one man kneeling	23r	Teschen 1822	Entry
Anonymous Italian painter, 15th century	One man seated, one man kneeling	23v	Teschen 1822	Entry
Anonymous Florentine painter, 15th century	The Mocking of Christ	20	Teschen 1822	Entry
Anonymous Florentine painter, 15th century	Old monk in profile, possibly Savonarola	61 r	Teschen 1822	Entry
Anonymous Florentine painter, 16th century	Study of angels	61 v	Teschen 1822	Entry
Anonymous Siennese painter, 16th century	Head of a young girl	2790	Teschen 1822	Entry
Anonymous Tuscan painter, 16th century	Brother Andrea de Servi in profile, wearing a hood	28	Teschen 1822	Entry
Anonymous Tuscan painter, 16th century	Tonsured monk in profile	29	Teschen 1822	Entry
Anonymous Tuscan painter, 16th century	Portrait of prior Michel Berteldi in profile	30	Teschen 1822	Entry
Anonymous Tuscan painter, 16th century	Poet wearing a laurel wreath	31	Teschen 1822	Entry
Anonymous Italian painter, 16th century	Jupiter embracing Callisto whilst disguised as Diana	514	Teschen 1822	Entry
Anonymous Italian painter, 16th century	Jupiter embracing Antiope whilst disguised as a satyr	515	Teschen 1822	Entry
Anonymous Italian painter, 16th century	Male pilgrim in a hood	25	Teschen 1822	Entry

==== British Museum ====
British Museum
Artist	Subject	Inventory number	Acquired from	Online
Carpaccio Vittore	Nude couple with demons; self-portrait.	1895,0915.807	John Wingfield Malcolm 1895	Entry
Garbo Raffaellino del	Studies of hands Study for a Resurrection.	Pp,1.14 Pp,1.32.	Richard Payne Knight 1824; Richard Payne Knight 1824	Entry Entry.
School of Gozzoli Benozzo	Two saints	1882,0812.218	Henry Hobhouse 1882	Entry
School of Lippi Filippino	Nude man holding a bow One man seated, one man standing, possibly for a St Sebastian.	Pp,1.4 Pp,1.15.	Richard Payne Knight 1824; Richard Payne Knight 1824	Entry Entry.
Perugino Pietro	Head of an old man	Pp,1.28	Richard Payne Knight 1824	Entry
Santacroce Girolamo da	Saints Roch, Christopher and Sebastian	1900,0717.32	Colnaghi 1900	Entry
Sciarpelloni Lorenzo	Virgin Adoring the Christ Child	Pp,1.30	Richard Payne Knight 1824	Entry
Tibaldi Pellegrino	Seated sibyl	Pp,2.187	Richard Payne Knight 1824	Entry
Anonymous Florentine artist, 15th century	Animals	1935,1214.2.1	Colnaghi 1935	Entry

==== Ecole des Beaux Arts ====
Ecole des Beaux Arts
Artist	Subject	Inventory number	Acquired from	Online
Anonymous Italian painter, c.1370	Life of saint Potitus	Recto + Verso		

==== Louvre ====
The first drawings from the Libro de' Disegni to enter the French national collection were bought by Everhard Jabach, probably when the Arundel collections were sold in 1646 and 1654 after his and his widow's deaths. They then passed from Jabach into Louis XIV's drawings collection in 1671. Further sheets from the Libro were added when the French royal collection bought part of the collection of Mariette in 1755 and when Saint-Morys's collection was seized by the revolutionary government in 1793. These later additions may have originated in the sale of the Crozat collection, for which a catalogue survives. Part of the Mariette collection was sold to the royal collection in 1775. Other pages entered the French national collection from émigré goods seized by the revolutionary government and via gift and purchase.

Musée du Louvre
Artists	Subject	Inventory number	Acquired from	Online
Allegri Antonio; Copy after Antonio Allegri	Bust of a nude seated woman, head of a child : study for Leda and the Swan; Profile of St John the Baptist	5922; 6019	Saint-Morys 1793; Saint-Morys 1793	Entry; Entry
Bandinelli Baccio	Nude man kneeling, seen in profile, undressing Neptune, with sea monsters at his feet	105; 122	Jabach 1671; Jabach 1671	Entry; Entry
Beccafumi Domenico	Torso of a woman, without head and arms, seen full-face, possibly Venus; Hercules, from behind, legs apart, holding his club Standing woman, facing the viewer, possibly Venus; Torture with the estrapade Nude man lying on the ground, possibly a river god	255; 255 bis 255 ter 256; 257	Mariette 1775; Mariette 1775; Mariette 1775; Mariette 1775; Mariette 1775	Entry; Entry; Entry; Entry; Entry
Bertoja Jacopo	Venus in her chariot and Cupid on the clouds Hercules with an old man and a woman, possibly Omphale	6064; 6064 bis	Jabach 1671; Jabach 1671	Entry; Entry
Bezzi Giovanni Francesco	Presentation of the Virgin in the Temple	7049	Saint-Morys 1793	Entry
Borgo Giovanni Paolo dal (Note: Vasari stated that Giovanni Paolo dal Borgo worked with him from 1546 on the Palazzo della Cancelleria (Giorgio Vasari, Les Vies des meilleurs peintres, sculpteurs et architectes, Book X, p.273 in the edition edited by André Chastel), then in the service of pope Paul III. Nothing else is known about him or his life, though Umberto Gnoli suggests he can be identified with Giovanni Paolo di Cola dal Borgo and that theory was supported by Ricci due to the journal of Berto Alberti, which refers to the death of a painter named Giovanni Paolo del Colle on 19 September 1556. He was mentioned in the marriage register entry for his sister Lodovica di Francesco di Michelangelo dal Colle, dating to 29 November 1538 and showing he was born around 1518. A 1550 document published by Josephine von Henneberg links him to the decoration of the Parisiani chapel in San Marcello al Corso in Rome. He can also be seen assisting Vasari in painting the refectory of the Monteoliveto monastery in Naples, as cited in a 1545 letter from Vasari to Don Miniato Pitti. Giovanni Paolo dal Borgo was one of the original painters of the Borgo San Sepolcro, known between 1542 and 1561 and a nephew of Raffaellino del Colle. Giovanni Paolo del Borgo was a member of Rome's guild of painters.)	Lamentation of Christ	652	Saint-Morys 1793	Entry
school of Sandro Botticelli	Helmeted male head; man in drapery, leaning to the right Two standing men in drapery	678 Recto; 678 Verso	Saint-Morys 1793; Saint-Morys 1793	Entry; Entry
Campi Antonio	The Flagellation; The Martyrdom of St Agatha	6260; 6268	Jabach 1671; Jabach 1671	Entry; Entry
Clovio Giulio	Statue of Hercules on a pedestal, with men drawing and contemplating it Virgin and Child on clouds, surrounded by several figures	48; 2820	Jabach 1671; Jabach 1671	Entry; Entry
Cungi Leonardo	Adoration of the Shepherds; Standing man, seen from behind	1112; 1113	Jabach 1671; Jabach 1671	Entry; Entry
Dosio Giovanni Antonio	Virgin and Child	1156	Jabach 1671	Entry
Farinati Paolo	St Jerome in the Desert; Allegory of the honour of Giacomo Foscarini	4847; 4875	Jabach 1671; Jabach 1671	Entry; Entry
Fiammeri Giovanni Battista	The Dead Christ Held Up By An Angel and Four Saints	3107	Jabach 1671	Entry
Fontana Giovanni Battista; Attributed to Giovanni Battista Fontana	Weeping over the dead Christ; Christ collapsing under the weight of the cross	4914; 5084	Jabach 1671; Jabach 1671	Entry; Entry
Francesco Maria da Cornazzano, known as Zoppino da Modena	Young woman helping a hermit out of a pit Battling tritons	6306; 6307	Jabach 1671; Jabach 1671	Entry; Entry
Franciabigio; Attributed to Franciabigio	Study for an altarpiece of the Virgin and Child with St Francis and the Archangel Gabriel; Holy Conversation : Virgin and Child with two saints	1202; 1671	Jabach 1671; Mariette 1775	Entry; Entry
Franco Battista	Study for The Resurrection of Christ and murder scene Standing woman holding up her left arm : study for Achilles recognised among the daughters of Lycomedes; Aeneas carrying his father Anchises on his shoulders Study of soldiers for The Resurrection of Christ; Figures after the antique : guerriers, cupids driving chariots, Hercules; Study for doctors of the law in Christ among the doctors	4932; 4946; 4946 Bis; 4958; 4966; 4985	Jabach 1671; Jabach 1671; Jabach 1671; Jabach 1671; Jabach 1671; Jabach 1671	Entry; Entry; Entry; Entry; Entry; Entry
Francucci Innocenzo	The Resurrection of Lazarus	8262	Jabach 1671	Entry
Gabriele da Fano	Christ at the column	3109	Jabach 1671	Entry
Ligorio Pirro	The Presentation of the Virgin in the Temple; An angel crowning the Christ Child with thorns, adored by St Jerome and the Virgin Mary; The Virgin and Child looking at an old man Prisoners kneeling before an enthroned king	9680; 9682; 9684; 9684 Bis	Jabach 1671; Jabach 1671; Jabach 1671; Jabach 1671	Entry; Entry; Entry; Entry
Manzuoli Tommaso, known as Maso da San Friano	Warrior and old man sitting holding a lyre, both seen from behind Standing figure, right profile Standing monk three-quarters face with joined hands Dinner in the house of Simon the Pharisee; Michael the Archangel holding a sword and scales and trampling the dragon underfoot Draped woman, flying near a nude old man sleeping on a bed	1306; 1306A; 1306B; 1306C; 1306D; 1306E	Jabach 1671; Jabach 1671; Jabach 1671; Jabach 1671; Jabach 1671; Jabach 1671	Entry; Entry; Entry; Entry; Entry; Entry
Marchesi Girolamo	Adoration of the Shepherds	8382	Jabach 1671	Entry
Mascherini Ottaviano	Annunciation with God the Father and the Holy Spirit; Adoration of the shepherds Virgin and Child enthroned with a papal saint and a priest-martyr Virgin and Child enthroned between Michael the Archangel and St John the Evangelist	8383; 8385; 8386; 8386Bis	Jabach 1671; Jabach 1671; Jabach 1671; Jabach 1671	Entry; Entry; Entry; Entry
Michele da Lucca	Frieze : children playing with a wolf and a lioness, with the lioness breastfeeding one of them Frieze : children playing with a wolf and a lioness Frieze : Triumph of Ariadne; Frieze : seven cupids on seahorses	1326; 1326 A 1326 B 1326 C	Jabach 1671; Jabach 1671; Jabach 1671; Jabach 1671	Entry; Entry; Entry; Entry
Miruoli Girolamo	Male mask	8399	Saint-Morys 1793	Entry
Moro Battista del	Dead Christ, supported by two angels and mourned by the Virgin Mary; Christ at the column	5080; 5080 Bis	Jabach 1671; Jabach 1671	Entry; Entry
Moro Giulio del	Diana and Endymion	5083	Jabach 1671	Entry
Moro Marco del	Christ and the Samaritan Woman	2799	Jabach 1671	Entry
Musi Agostino dei	Semi-nude woman leaning on a pedestal in a landscape	3585	Jabach 1671	Entry
Muziano Girolamo	The Resurrection of Lazarus; Christ handing the keys to St Peter; Noli me tangere St Francis receiving the stigmata	5094; 5095; 5095 Bis; 5107	Jabach 1671; Jabach 1671; Jabach 1671; Jabach 1671	Entry; Entry; Entry; Entry
Passarotti Bartolomeo	Apollo, standing, holding his bow and arrows, with his lyre at his feet	8464	Jabach 1671	Entry
Copy after Giovanni Francesco Penni	Birth and naming of St John the Baptist	4268	Jabach 1671	Entry
Peruzzi Baldassarre Tommaso; Attributed to Peruzzi; Copy after Peruzzi	Satirical allegory : Mercury purged A ruse of war Plan for a circular image with scenes from the stories of Moses and Joseph	1419; 1422; 4259	Mariette 1775; Jabach 1671; Jabach 1671	Entry; Entry; Entry
Pinariccio Felice	The Mystic Marriage of St Catherine of Alexandria; St Catherine of Alexandria; Saint Lucy, standing, facing the viewer, her head in left profile	8506; 8507; 8507Bis	Jabach 1671; Jabach 1671; Jabach 1671	Entry; Entry; Entry
Pippi Giulio known as Giulio Romano	Virgin and Child with Saints Stephen, Jerome, Antony the Great and George; The Fall of Icarus; A long-haired dog Female captive, seated in front of trophies Victory with trophies, writing on a shield David holding the head of Goliath	3464; 3499; 3573; 3573A; 3573B; 3573C	Jabach 1671; Jabach 1671; Jabach 1671; Jabach 1671; Jabach 1671; Jabach 1671	Entry; Entry; Entry; Entry; Entry; Entry
Attributed to Giulio Peppi	Seated Virgin playing with the Christ Child; Virgin and Child with Saints Benedict and John the Evangelist	3580; 3581	Jabach 1671; Jabach 1671	Entry; Entry
Primaticcio Francesco	Pan, seated in the clouds, surrounded by children floating in the air Venus seated on the clouds	8563; 8563 Bis	Jabach 1671; Jabach 1671	Entry; Entry
Procaccini Ercole le Vieux	Longinus piercing Christ's side between the two thieves	6740	Jabach 1671	Entry
Pupini Biagio	The Wedding Feast at Cana; Holy Family surrounded by angels and saints	4286; 6858	Jabach 1671; Jabach 1671	Entry; Entry
Giovanni Battista Ramenghi known as Bagnacavallo	Warrior, in classical dress, standing, facing the viewer, holding the shaft of a lance	8894	Jabach 1671	Entry
Robusti Jacopo	Lamentation of Christ	5371	Jabach 1671	Entry
Rosso Fiorentino	Virgin of Pity	1579	Saint-Morys 1793	Entry
Sabatini Lorenzo	Hercules, facing the viewer, holding Cerberus in chains in his left hand Christ in the Temple among the Doctors; St Peter, standing, three quarter profile, head facing the viewer The Wedding Feast at Cana	9008; 9008A; 9008B; 9008C	Jabach 1671; Jabach 1671; Jabach 1671; Jabach 1671	Entry; Entry; Entry; Entry
Salviati Francesco	Warrior in classical dress, standing, facing the viewer, holding the shaft of a lance Kneeling St Jérôme with another monk or friar, possibly St Francis; St John the Evangelist supported by an altar Male nude, facing the viewer Veiled female nude, turned to the right, surrounded by a niche	1642; 1642A; 1642B; 1642C; 1648	Jabach 1671; Jabach 1671; Jabach 1671; Jabach 1671; Jabach 1671	Entry; Entry; Entry; Entry; Entry
Samacchini Orazio	Virgin Mary with St Joseph, an angel and the sleeping Christ Child; Saint Bibiana, standing, facing the viewer, leaning on a broken column Holy Family served by angels during the Flight into Egypt; Three soldiers in classical dress, with their heads turned away Putti disarming Cupid sleeping in his chariot Nude child, facing the viewer, standing on a medallion, arms spread wide Nude child, crowned, seen from behind, held by another child's arm	9024; 9024A; 9024B; 9024C; 9024D; 9024E; 9024F	Jabach 1671; Jabach 1671; Jabach 1671; Jabach 1671; Jabach 1671; Jabach 1671; Jabach 1671	Entry; Entry; Entry; Entry; Entry; Entry; Entry
Sarto Andrea del	Study for a head of St Francis Study of a hand Main et pieds Draped and seated man, writing Head of a bald bearded man, left profile Five studies of hands Studies of arms and hands, with one hand holding a loaf of bread Three studies of legs Four studies of a left foot Study of legs Dragon devouring a snake Knight putting on his armour Profile head of a man	1678 Recto; 1678 Verso; 1679; 1680 Recto; 1680 Verso; 1714 1714A 1714B 1714C 1714D 1724; 1724.2; 1726	Saint-Morys 1793; Saint-Morys 1793; Saint-Morys 1793; Saint-Morys 1793; Saint-Morys 1793; William II 1850; William II 1850; William II 1850; William II 1850; William II 1850; Jabach 1671; Jabach 1671; Jabach 1671	Entry; Entry; Entry; Entry; Entry; Entry Entry Entry Entry Entry Entry; Entry; Entry
Schiavone Andrea	The Wedding Feast at Cana; Three figures fighting, with an old man seated near a tree Apollo flaying Marsyas	5450; 5452; 5452bis	Jabach 1671; Jabach 1671; Jabach 1671	Entry; Entry; Entry
Sciarpelloni Lorenzo Attributed to Lorenzo Sciarpelloni.	Three-quarter study of the head of a woman wearing a hair net Design for a funerary monument Nude seated child, body turned to the left Virgin and Child; Nude seated child, holding its right leg.	1783; 1788; 1792; 1792 Bis; 1792 Ter	Mariette 1775; Mariette 1775; Saint-Morys 1793; Saint-Morys 1793; Saint-Morys 1793	Entry; Entry; Entry; Entry; Entry.
Serafino da Verona (Note: Serafino da Verona was probably Serafino Serafini (c. 1533, 1595/1605) who belonged to a family of painters from Verona. Most of his works are lost. He painted a fresco of The Virgin and Child with Saints Roch and Sebastian on one of the gates of Castelvecchio. He is also known to have produced a Crucifixion with Saints now held by the parish church in Zimella. Serafino da Verona is cited at the bottom of two pages from Vasari's Libro.)	Adam and Eve chased from the Earthly Paradise; Mary Magdalene in the desert, seated, turning towards the right	5459; 5460	Jabach 1671; Jabach 1671	Entry; Entry
Tamagni Vincenzo	Priest saying Mass; Half-length of a seated man, writing Five sketches of angels flying and playing instruments Descent from the Cross; Lamentation.	1246; 1247; 1247 Bis; 1247 Ter.	Mariette 1775; Saint-Morys 1793; Saint-Morys 1793; Saint-Morys 1793	Entry; Entry; Entry; Entry.
Taraschi Giovanni	Female warrior receiving weapons from a genius	6789	Jabach 1671	Entry
Tito Santi di	The Road to Emmaus	1929	Jabach 1671	Entry
Todi Lucio da	Martydrom of a male saint, possibly St Sebastian	1963	Jabach 1671	Entry
Uccello Paolo	Portrait of Louis II of Naples in profile wearing a cap and a crown Portrait of Manuel Chrysoloras, wearing a bonnet and holding a book Left profile of a man's head.	9849; 9849 Bis; RF 730.	Saint-Morys 1793; Saint-Morys 1793; His de la Salle 1878	Entry; Entry; Entry.
Vasari Giorgio	Design for a scheme for a barrel vault with side arches Last Judgement altarpiece Cupid Hunting	2076 2153; 2169	Ercole III 1796; Jabach 1671; Jabach 1671	Entry Entry; Entry
Zuccaro Federico	Annunciation	4539	Jabach 1671	Entry
Anonymous Florentine artist, 15th century	Dog seizing a hare Study of a nude man on a bed Half-length of a nude man, seen from behind, holding a baton.	1256; 1256 Bis; 1256 Ter.	Saint-Morys 1793; Saint-Morys 1793; Saint-Morys 1793	Entry; Entry; Entry.
Anonymous Italian painter, 15th century	Christ crucified between the two thieves	9839	Jabach 1671	Entry
Anonymous Italian painter, late 16th century	Pentecost	1654	Jabach 1671	Entry
Anonymous Italian painter, 16th century	Virgin and Child	10029	Jabach 1671	Entry
Anonymous Venetian painter, 16th century	Woman standing ina landscape, hands folded and eyes raised to the sky	5659	Jabach 1671	Entry

==== Munich ====
Staatliche Graphische Sammlung München
Artist	Subject	Inventory number	Acquired from	Online
Pollaiolo Antonio	Study for the equestrian statue of Francesco Sforza			

==== Stockholm ====
The museum acquired 83 drawings from the Libro as part of the Pierre Crozat and Carl Gustaf Tessin collections. They include Domenico Ghirlandaio's Head of an Old Man, a study for his 1490 painting An Old Man and his Grandson, now in the Louvre.

Nationalmuseum
Artist	Subject	Inventory number	Acquired from	Online
Ghirlandaio Domenico	Portrait of an old man	NMH 1/1863	Tessin, then Swedish Royal Collection	Entry
Circle of Uccello Paolo	Six animal studies	NMH 45d/1863	Tessin, then Swedish Royal Collection	Entry

==== Uffizi ====
Uffizi
Artist	Subject	Inventory number	Acquired from	Online
Sangallo Giuliano da	Tabernacle	1669 A	Jean-Baptiste Séroux d'Agincourt 1798	Entry

=== US collections ===
==== Metropolitan ====
Metropolitan Museum of Art
Artist	Subject	Inventory number	Acquired from	Online
Franciabigio	Study for an altarpiece of the Virgin and Child with Two Saints			
Pollaiolo Antonio	Study for the equestrian statue of Francesco Sforza	1975.1.410	Lehman Collection	
Spinelli Parri	Study of Giotto's Navicella			

==== National Gallery of Art ====
National Gallery of Art
Artist	Subject	Inventory number	Acquired from	Online
Botticelli Sandro	Portrait of a young man, forearm and left hand	1991.190.1; 1991.190.1.a	Woodner Collection 1991	Entry; Entry
Garbo Raffaellino del	Saints Roch, Antony the Great and Catherine of Alexandria	1991.190.1.h	Woodner Collection 1991	Entry
Lippi Filippino	Standing young nude Man with a baton Studies of different subjects Dancing putto holding a drape Angel holding a torch Two angels holding torches Standing woman in prayer Two draped standing women.	1991.190.1.b 1991.190.1.c 1991.190.1.d 1991.190.1.e 1991.190.1.f 1991.190.1.g 1991.190.1.i 1991.190.1.j.	Woodner Collection 1991; Woodner Collection 1991; Woodner Collection 1991; Woodner Collection 1991; Woodner Collection 1991; Woodner Collection 1991; Woodner Collection 1991; Woodner Collection 1991	Entry Entry Entry Entry Entry Entry Entry Entry.

==== Yale ====
Yale University Art Gallery
Artist	Title	Inventory number	Acquired from	Online

== Bibliography ==
- Otto Kurz, Giorgio Vasari's Libro de'Disegni, Old Masters Drawings, 1937
- Arthur Ewart Popham, Drawings from the collection of Giorgio Vasari, p. 153-155, British Museum Quarterly, 1936
- Per Bjurstrom, Italian Drawings from the Collection of Giorgio Vasari, National Museum, Stockholm, 2001 ISBN 9789171006264
- Andrew Morrogh, Vasari's Libro de' Disegni and Niccolò Gaddi's Collection of Drawings: The Work of Gaddi's "Chief Framer", conference paper at the RSA Annual Meeting, New York, NY, Hilton New York, 2014
- (in French) Stéfania Caliandro, Le Libro de' Disegni de Giorgio Vasari: un métatexte visuel, Presses universitaires de l'université de Limoges, 1999 ISBN 2-84287-128-6 Sample
- (in French) Giorgio Vasari, Les vies des meilleurs peintres, sculpteurs et architectes, édition commentée sous la direction d'André Chastel, Du texte à l'image. Dessins du "Libro", Berger-Levrault, Paris, 1989 ISBN 978-2-701307541
- (in French) Catherine Monbeig-Goguel, Giorgio Vasari : Dessinateur et collectionneur, XXXVIe exposition du Cabinet des dessins du musée du Louvre, Réunion des musées nationaux, Paris, 1965
- (in French) Catherine Monbeig Goguel, Dessins italiens au musée du Louvre, deuxième moitié du XVIe siècle (artistes nés après 1500 et morts avant 1580). Vasari et son temps, Éditions des Musées nationaux, Paris, 1972 ISBN 978-2-711800124, présentation du livre : p. 823-824, École pratique des hautes études. 4e, Sciences historiques et philologiques, année 1972 (read online)
- (in French) Catherine Monbeig Goguel, Le dessin encadré, p. 25-31, Revue de l'Art, année 1987, No. 76 (online)
- (in French) Alphonse Wyatt, Le Libro dei Disegni de Vasari, p. 339-351, Gazette des beaux-arts, octobre-novembre-décembre 1859 (online)
- (in Italian) Licia Ragghianti Collobi, Il Libro de' Disegni del Vasari, Vallecchi, Florence, 1996 ISBN 9788825200188
