= Niccolò Gaddi (1537–1591) =

Italian nobleman and art collector

Niccolò Gaddi (12 October 1537, Florence - 14 June 1591, Florence) was an Italian nobleman and art collector

== Life ==
He was the son of Sinibaldo di Taddeo Gaddi and Lucrezia Strozzi, daughter of Matteo Strozzi. The Gaddi family had occupied a major role in Florentine political life for a long while - Angelo and Taddeo Gaddi were members of the Signoria, Sinibaldo himself was made a senator in 1545 and Sinibaldo's brother Niccolò became a cardinal. They also acquired some important codices of Dante's works at the end of the 14th century.

Around 1550 Gaddi was studying Latin and Hebrew under Francesco Vagnucci, who later dedicated his translation of the works of Giuseppe Ebreo to Gaddi. This humanist education was probably intended to prepare Gaddi for a career in the church, and at the age of fourteen he took minor orders. His cardinal uncle immediately granted him an income of 1000 scudi a year from the funds of the Diocese of Bologna and later also granted him other income-producing estates of the archdiocese of Cosenza and the Abbey of San Leonardo di Siponto in Apulia. In 1559 Gaddi had an illegitimate daughter named Lucrezia and around the same time he returned to the status of a layman, marrying Emilia, daughter of Lorenzo Ridolfi. Around 1552 he became a knight of the Order of St James of the Sword, then headed by Charles V as King of Spain.

After learning how to dress, think, and behave as a knight, Gaddi gave up banking and commerce, in effect becoming more like a rentier, activity which raised him around 50,000 scudi a year, mostly from estates in land and public debt securities. He lived lavishly, keeping a great many servants and horses, exhibiting his collections of art and other objects in his palazzo on the Piazza Madonna degli Aldobrandini in Florence and adding a botanical garden to it. He also hired the Flemish botanist Joseph Goedenhuyze and introduced him to the Grand Dukes of Tuscany. After his first wife's death in 1563, Gaddi married again, this time to Maria, a daughter of Alfonso Strozzi.

In 1569 Cosimo de' Medici was granted the title of grand duke by the pope. That same year he sent Gaddi to Mantua and Ferrara to give their lords' news of this promotion and in 1570 he attended Cosimo's coronation in Rome. Between 1573 and 1590 Gaddi was one of those supervising the Stinche Prison in Florence, as well as sitting several times with the 'accoppiatori', those who prepared electoral lists for civil offices which were elected by lot. He was also made a grand-ducal senator on 12 November 1578. In 1575 he was an 'operaio' at Santa Maria del Fiore, in 1579 one of the nine 'conservatori del Dominio', in 1581 the supreme magistrate and in 1582 one of the eight 'guardia e balia'.

1587 was a busy year for him, in which he acted as the health official, one of the reformers of the merchants' statutes and one of the lay reformers of nunneries. In 1588 he was one of the 'Conservatori di leggi', took part in converting the hospice linked to the monastery of San Paolo, Florence into a hospital for convalescents and was also given charge of planning the festivities for Christine of Lorraine's arrival in Florence to marry Ferdinand I. He set up a series of temporary triumphal arches adorned with sculptures and paintings along the path of the procession, commissioning G A Dosio to design them and A. Allori, D. Oresti (known as il Passignano) and G.B. Naldini to produce the paintings. He demanded that the paintings be in oils.

However, he is more notable as an art collector and advisor to the Medici art collections. For example, he negotiated their acquisition of "a marble portrait head of Homer, the Greek poet". He owned around 200 paintings by his death but unusually for his time he also appreciated the preparatory drawings and cartoons made for frescoes - by his death he had even acquired for himself the whole of Giorgio Vasari's Libro de' Disegni. Between 1586 and 1590 he was put in charge of the Uffizi's painting collections, then mostly made up of Medici family portraits. He commissioned works from Giovan Battista Paggi, Naldini, Santi di Tito and Girolamo Macchietti, his favourite artists, who probably also produced works for Gaddi's own collection. He also collected (mostly ancient Roman) statues and vases and by his death owned nine sundials, 2700 medals in different metals, 1270 general books and manuscripts, 130 music books and manuscripts, around 40 musical instruments and a small collection of exotic curiosities, minerals, corals and shells.

Gaddi made his will on 11 June 1591 and died three days later - he was buried in his family tomb in Santa Maria Novella. The will added his collection to the trust set up by his father and already including most of his father's goods - if the male Gaddi line died out, the trust was to go to descendants of his sister Maddalena, wife of Jacopo Pitti. However, only a few years after his death, the collection began to be dispersed, despite the best efforts of Vincenzo Gonzaga's wife Eleonora de' Medici - she had made an advance offer to buy the whole collection on 28 June 1591, only a fortnight after Gaddi's death, but this did not prove successful. What remained of Gaddi's library by the 1700s was bought by the grand dukes in 1755, followed by what was left of the artworks in 1774.
