= Daniel Fröschl =

- Daniel Fröschl, Madonna with Child, Kunsthistorisches Museum, Vienns
- Born: 1563; Augsburg, Holy Roman Empire
- Died: 15 October 1613 (aged 49–50); Prague, Holy Roman Empire
- Known for: Painting
- Movement: German Renaissance
- Patrons: Rudolf II, Holy Roman Emperor

Daniel Fröschl (1563 – 15 October 1613) was a German Renaissance draughtsman, painter and antiquarian. He was a significant figure in the Prague court of Emperor Rudolf II.

== Biography ==
Fröschl was born in Augsburg in 1563. The son of an Augsburg advocate, by 1580 he is documented as a fully trained miniaturist. He may have worked for Ulisse Aldrovandi in Bologna before taking service (1597–1604) with the Grand Duke of Tuscany Ferdinando I de' Medici. In 1601 he was summoned to the court of Rudolf II in Prague on the recommendation of the German painter Hans von Aachen, and he was confirmed in the post of miniaturist there on 28 December 1601. After returning to Italy he continued to work for Rudolf II and was eventually appointed court miniaturist in 1603, though he does not seem to have settled in Prague until 1604. In 1607 Fröschl was appointed court antiquarian: between then and 1611 he drew up the inventory (Vaduz, Fürstliche Sammlungen Liechtenstein) of Rudolf II's cabinet of curiosities, listing works belonging to the categories of nature (Naturalia), arts and crafts (Artefacta) and science (Scientifica). Philipp Hainhofer’s account in 1610 claims that this left him hardly any time for painting. After Rudolph's death in 1612 Fröschl was accused of misappropriating items from the Emperor’s cabinet of curiosities, and of political meddling.

Very little of Fröschl's work as a painter has been preserved. He was famous for his miniatures, especially nature studies that undoubtedly owed much to the Prague work of Roelant Savery. However, Fröschl's studies of birds, drawings with 'perspective spheres' and still lifes of flowers are known only from written sources. Otherwise Fröschl often borrowed subject-matter from other works of the Rudolfine court, where the inspiration for many pictures can be traced back to the personal ideas of the Emperor. Amorous encounters between the gods and mythological couples, episodes from the Austro-Turkish Wars and the glorification of the Emperor can be found in his work. Adam and Eve, one of his earliest works for Rudolf II, is a copy after a drawing by Bartholomeus Spranger. A frog beside the monogram D.F. makes a subtle play on the artist's surname.

The Expulsion from Paradise, gouache on vellum, 12.5 × 9.6 cm, Metropolitan Museum of Art, New York

One of the favourite themes of Rudolfine art, the female nude viewed from behind, recurs in Fröschl's watercolour Zeus and Antiope ('Two Satyrs and a Nymph with Putto'; Edinburgh, Scottish National Gallery), which also refers back to Spranger's Adam and Eve. The miniature Mercury and Psyche (Vienna, Kunsthistorisches Museum) seems an allegory of peace after the Long Turkish War ended in 1606, with the divine couple suspended above a view of Prague with Hradčany Castle. However, a second level of interpretation is also conceivable: Psyche, the personification of the human soul, is raised to immortality by the god of knowledge. Two of Fröschl's compositions draw on Dürer, whose work was also represented in Rudolf's collection. The watercolour Virgin with Child and a Portrait of Dürer (Vienna, Kunsthistorisches Museum) draws on two drawings by Dürer (both Vienna, Albertina). The Virgin with Child and Bunches of Grapes (Prague, Loreto Treasury), based on a drawing by Dürer related to his Virgin and Child with the Pear (1512; Vienna, Kunsthistorisches Museum), is one of Fröschl's few miniature oil paintings to have been preserved.
