= Orto Botanico di Firenze =

Botanical garden in Florence, Italy

Coordinates: 43°46′44″N 11°15′41″E

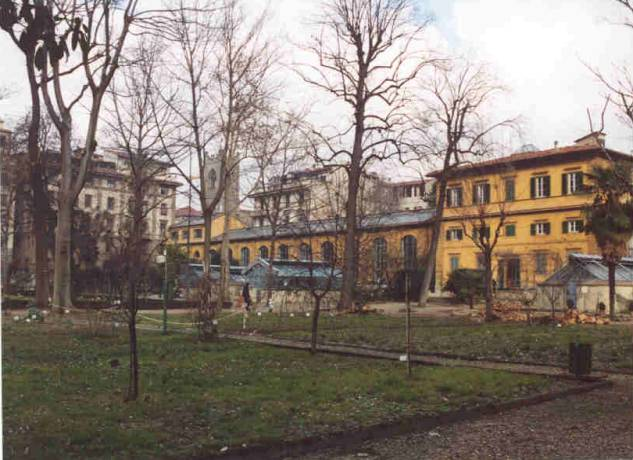
Orto Botanico di Firenze

The Orto Botanico di Firenze (2.3 hectares), also known as the Giardino dei Semplici, the "Garden of simples", is a botanical garden maintained by the University of Florence. It is located at Via Micheli, 3, Florence, Italy, and open weekday mornings.

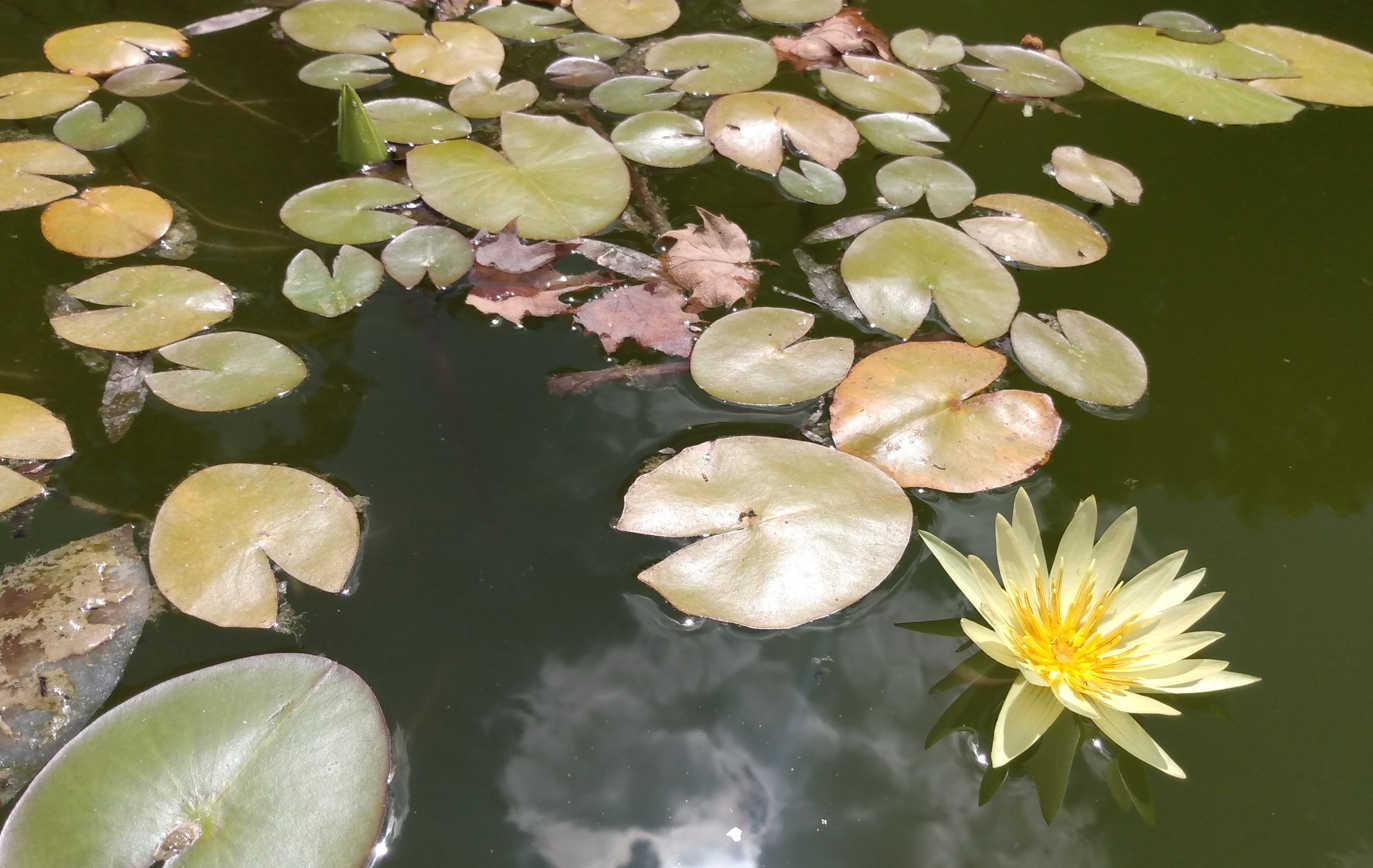
Water lily in the fountain

The garden was established on December 1, 1545, by Cosimo I de' Medici, Grand Duke of Tuscany, and is Europe's third oldest, behind the Orto Botanico di Pisa and the Orto Botanico di Padova. It was first laid out by landscape gardener Niccolò Pericoli to a botanical system and plantings chosen by Luca Ghini, and rose to prominence under Cosimo III, with Pier Antonio Micheli as its director. As was typical of early European botanical gardens, its prime interest was in medicinal plants. However, as in 1753 the Società Botanica was formed, the garden's focus turned to "experimental agriculture" and its layout was revised accordingly. The garden grounds opened to the public in the mid-19th century, at about the same time that its glass houses (1694 m^{2}) were constructed.

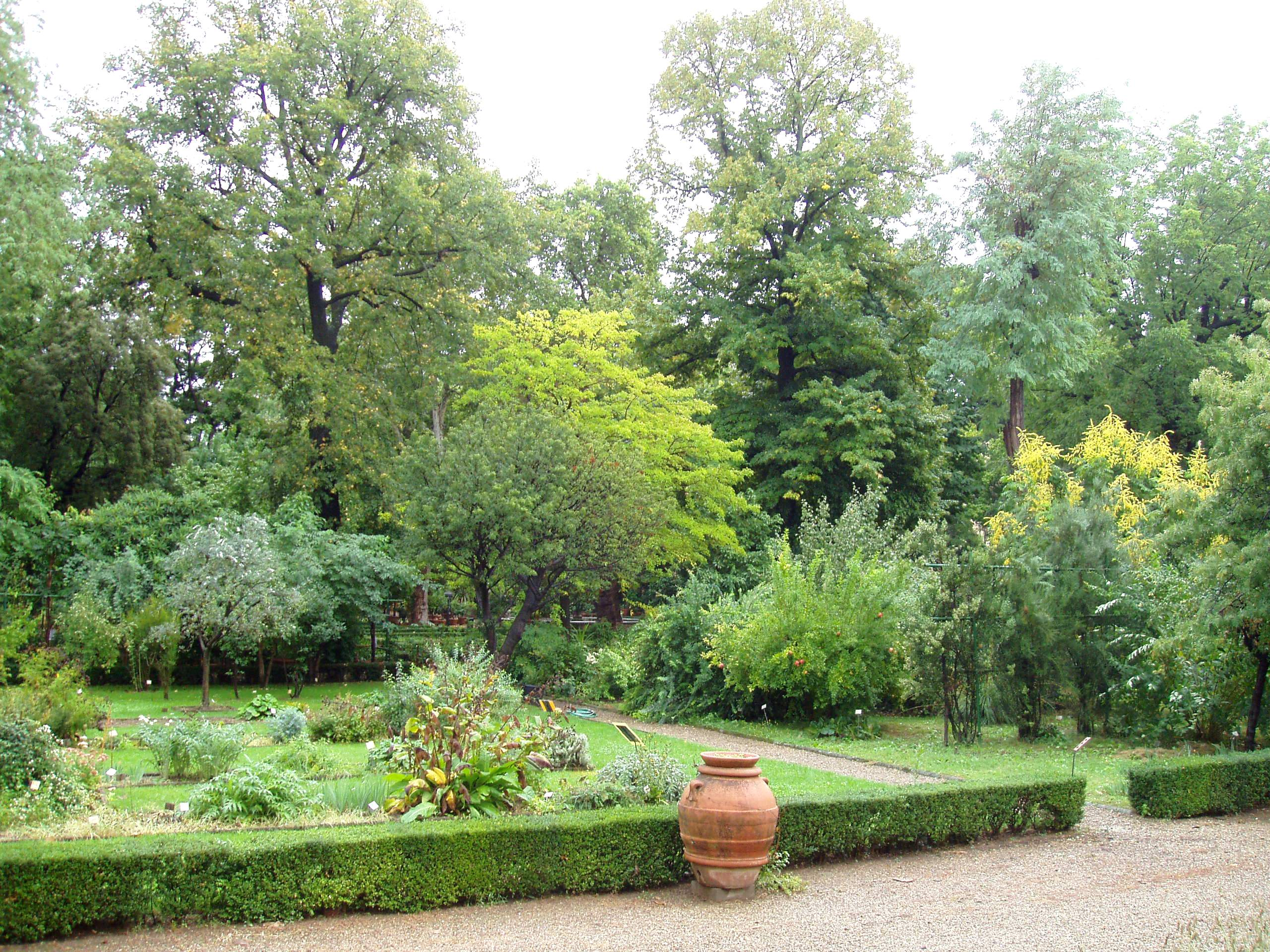
General view

Today the garden contains some 9,000 plant specimens laid out in a roughly square site surrounded by walls, crossed by a grid of walkways, and with a central fountain. Some trees are quite old, including a Taxus baccata (1720) and Quercus suber (1805). Other species include:

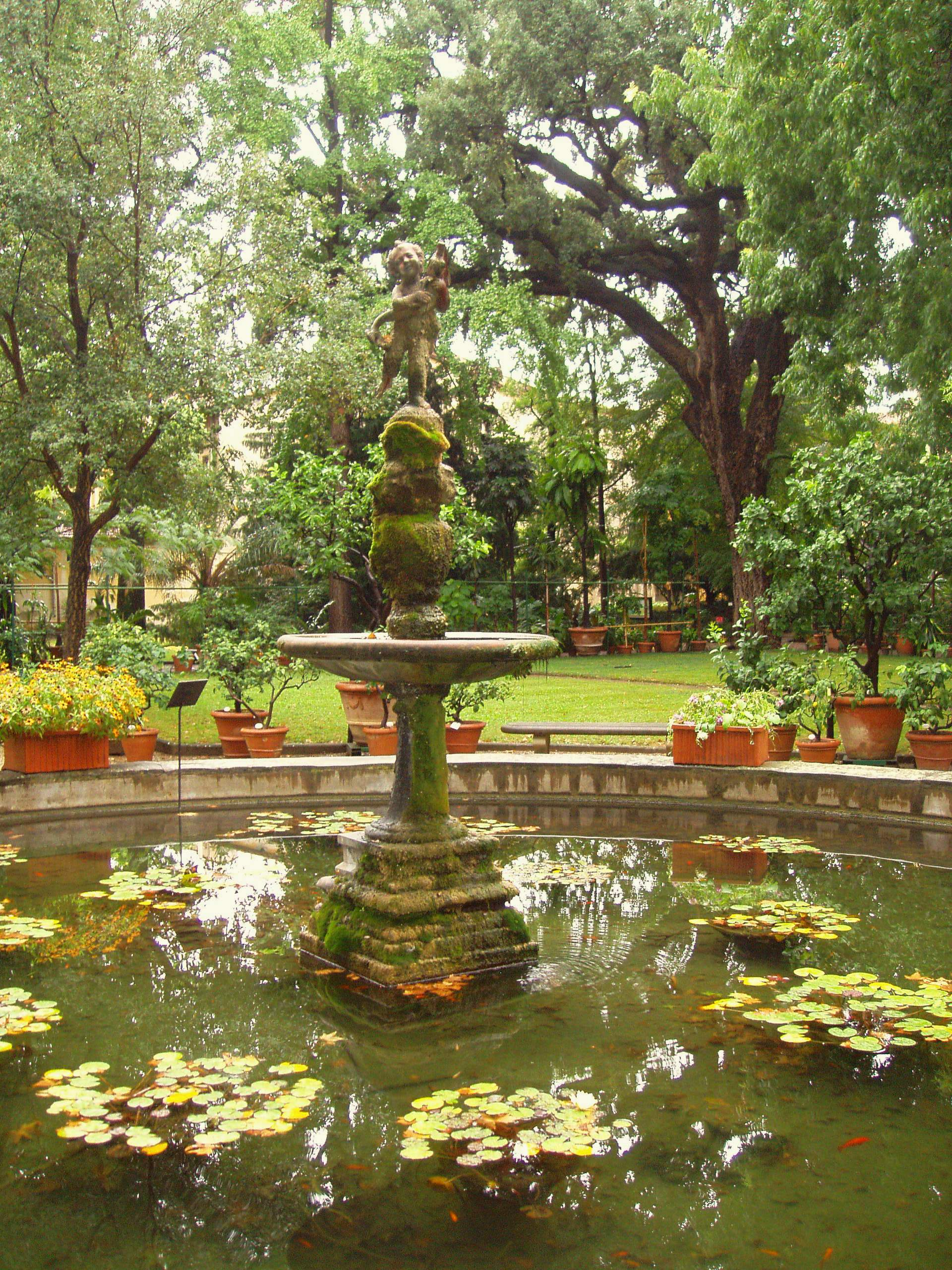
Central fountain, with a copy of Verrocchio's Putto with a Dolphin

- Acer negundo
- Aesculus hippocastanum
- Alnus cordata
- Araucaria imbricata
- Arbutus × andrachnoides
- Archontophoenix cunninghamiana
- Calocedrus decurrens
- Cedrus atlantica
- Cedrus deodara
- Cedrus libani
- Celtis occidentalis
- Ceratozamia mexicana
- Cupressus funebris
- Cupressus goveniana
- Cupressus sempervirens
- Cupressus torulosa
- Cycas revoluta,
- Cydonia oblonga
- Digitalis lanata
- Digitalis purpurea
- Dionaea muscipula
- Dioon edule
- Dioon purpusii
- Diospyros lotus
- Encephalartos afer
- Encephalartos ferox
- Encephalartos horridus
- Encephalartos munchii
- Encephalartos natalensis,
- Encephalartos trispinosus,
- Brahea armata,
- Fagus sylvatica,
- Fagus sylvatica pendula,
- Fraxinus excelsior,
- Ginkgo biloba,
- Juglans nigra,
- Lagerstroemia indica,
- Liriodendron tulipifera,
- Magnolia grandiflora,
- Melissa officinalis,
- Metasequoia glyptostroboides
- Ostrya carpinifolia
- Pinus halepensis sbsp brutia
- Pinus nigra sbsp laricio
- Pinus wallichiana
- Pistacia chinensis
- Pistacia terebinthus
- Platanus spp.
- Pterocarya stenoptera
- Quercus cerris,
- Quercus ilex,
- Quercus lusitanica
- Quercus macrolepis
- Quercus robur
- Sequoia sempervirens
- Sophora japonica
- Taxodium distichum
- Taxodium mucronatum,
- Tilia platyphyllos,
- Torreya californica,
- Torreya nucifera,
- Torreya nucifera,
- Trachycarpus fortunei,
- Washingtonia filifera,
- Yucca australis,
- Zelkova carpinifolia,
- Zelkova crenata,
- Zelkova serrata

== See also ==
- List of botanical gardens in Italy
- Museo di Storia Naturale di Firenze
- Certosa di Pisa
