= Orto botanico di Pisa =

Botanic garden and museum in Italy

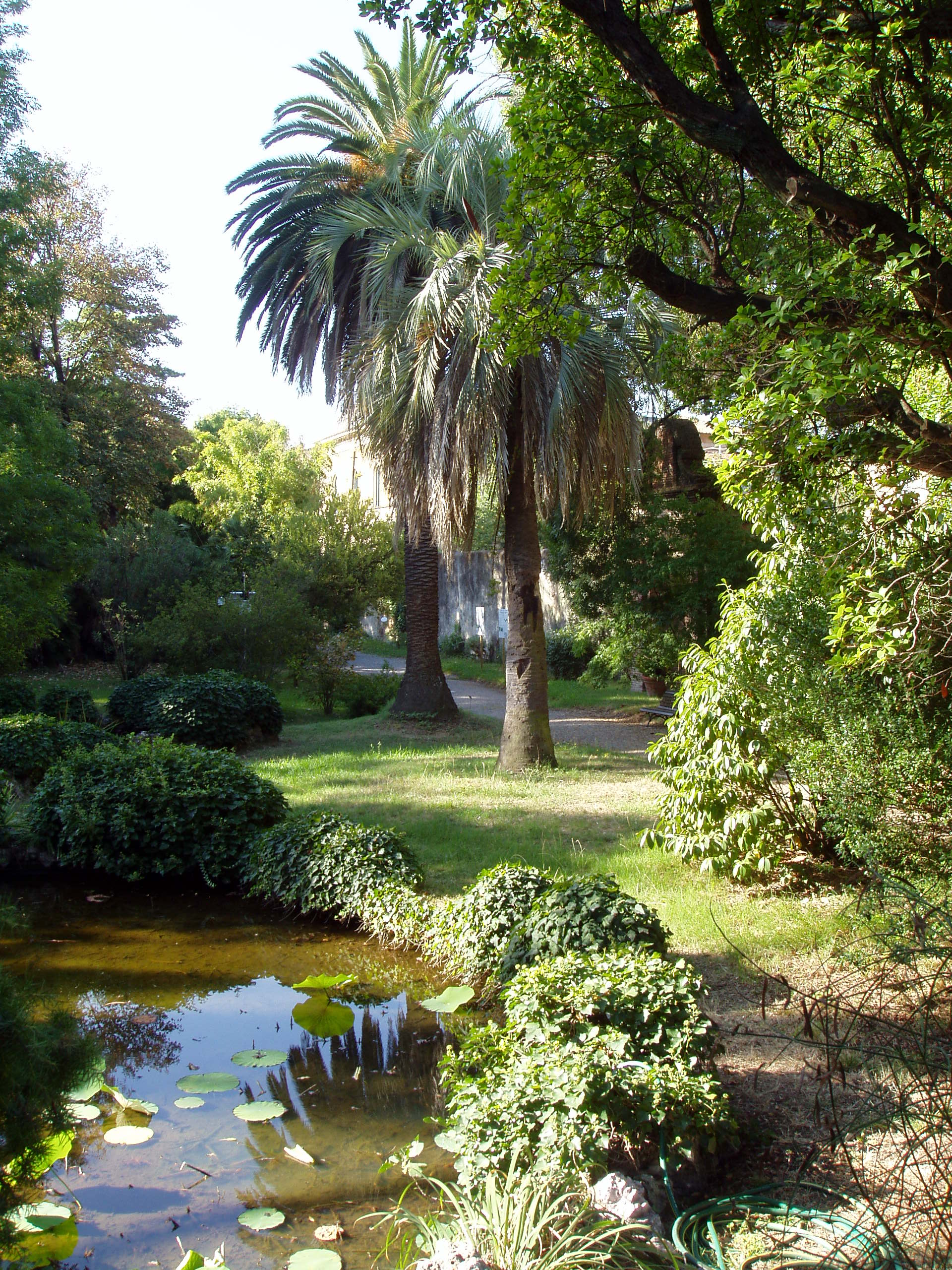
- View of the Orto botanico di Pisa.

- Location within Italy
- Type: Botanical garden
- Location: via Luca Ghini 5, Pisa, Italy
- Coordinates: 43.7198°N 10.3959°E
- Opened: 1544
- Status: Open year round
- Website: Official website

The Orto botanico di Pisa, also known as the Orto Botanico dell'Università di Pisa, is a botanical garden operated by the University of Pisa, and located at via Luca Ghini 5, Pisa, Italy.

The garden was established in 1544 under Cosimo I de' Medici as the first university botanical garden in Europe, and entrusted to the famous botanist Luca Ghini of Imola. In 1563 the garden was relocated from its original riverside location (now the Medicean Arsenal) to one near the convent of Santa Marta, and in 1591 (under Joseph Goedenhuyze) again moved to its third and current location. From these early times, the garden has contained a gallery of natural objects (now Pisa's Museo di Storia Naturale), a library (now part of the university library), and portraits of its directors throughout the centuries. It also includes one of the earliest iron-framed hothouses built in Italy.

Today the garden is divided into sections containing the botanical school, gardens, ponds, greenhouses, and various buildings. Major collections include herb gardens and arboreta, as well as the old botany institute, built 1591–1595, with a facade ornamented with sea-shells.

== Gallery ==
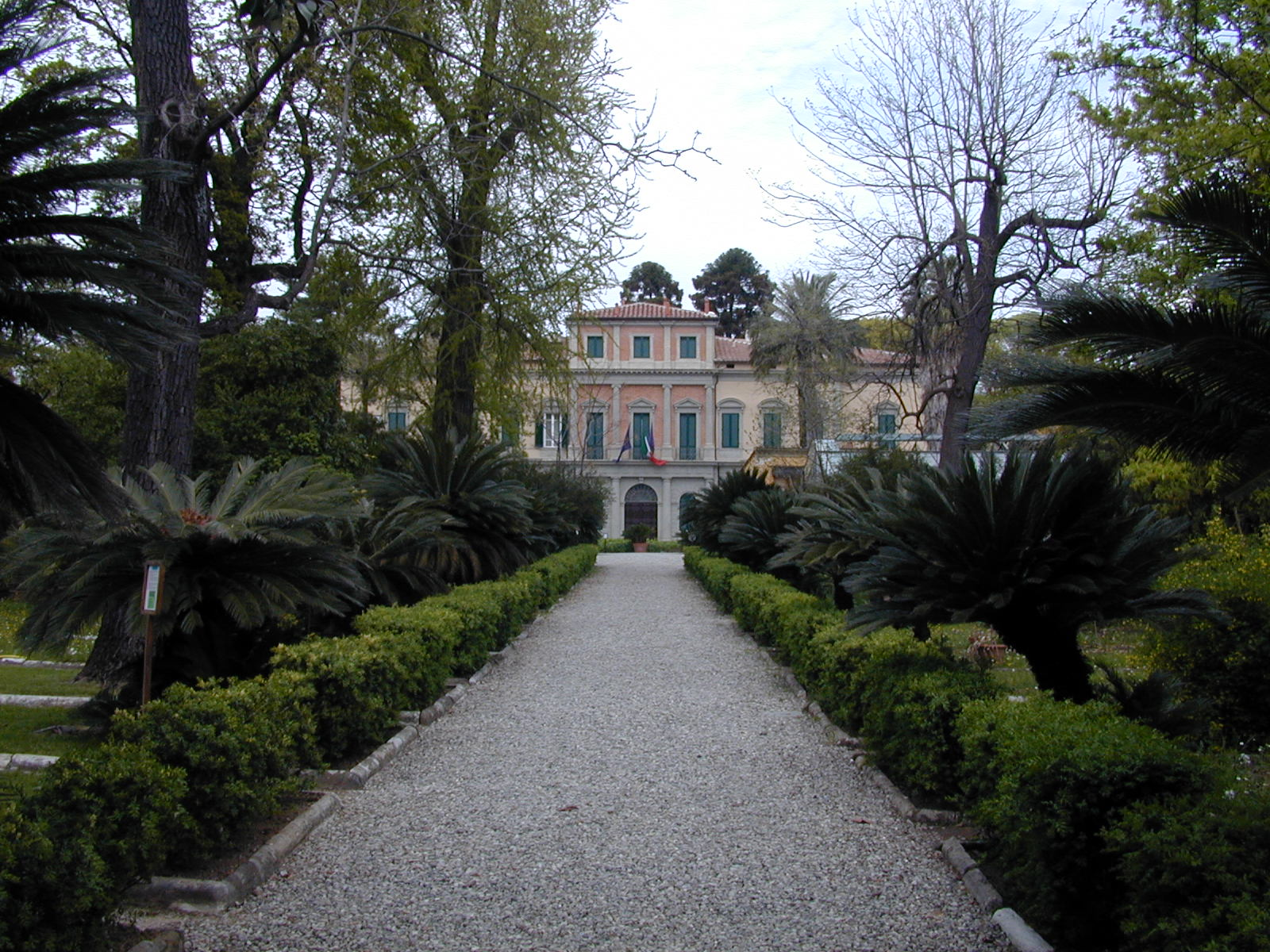
Botanical school.

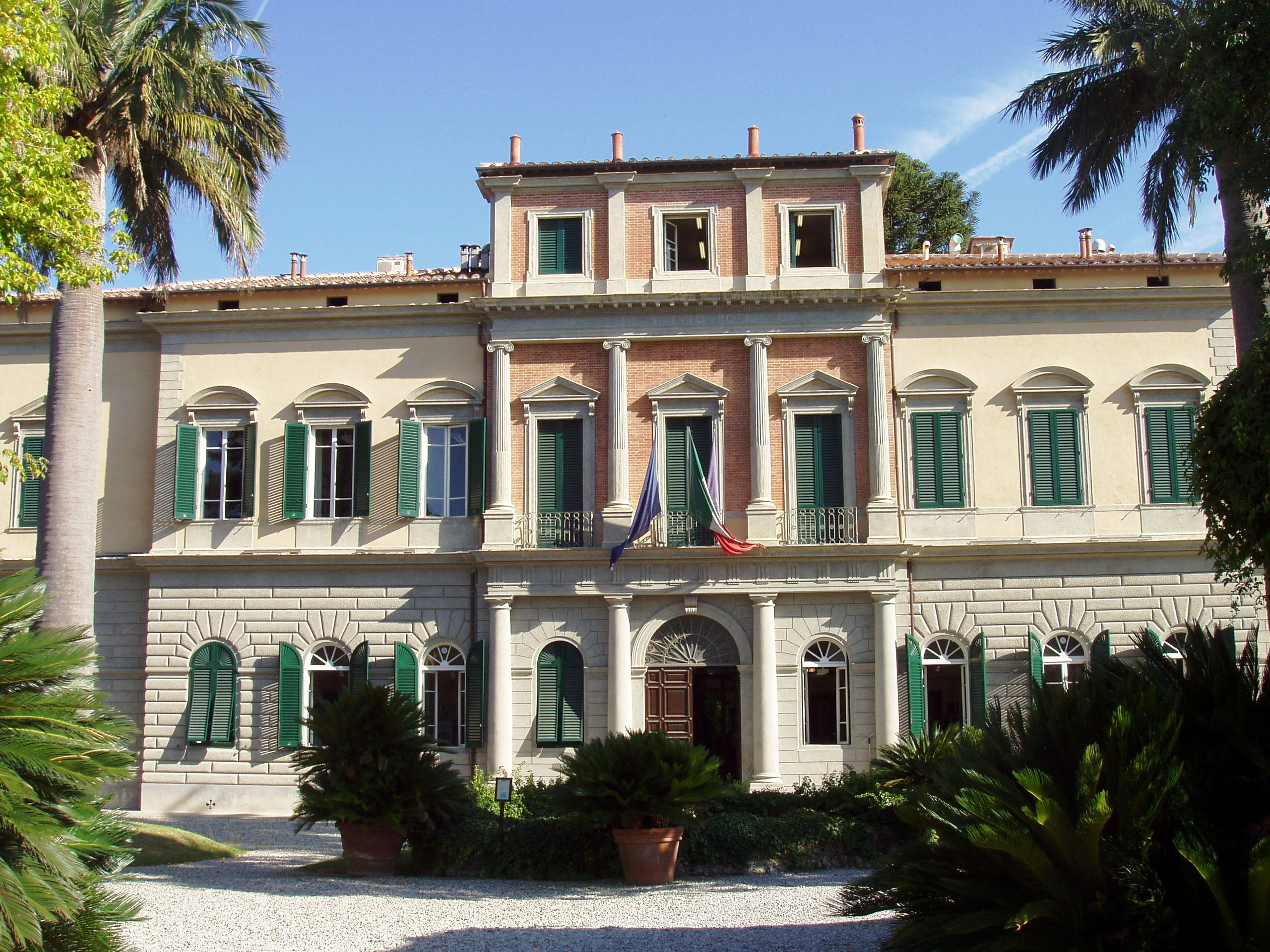
Botanical school.

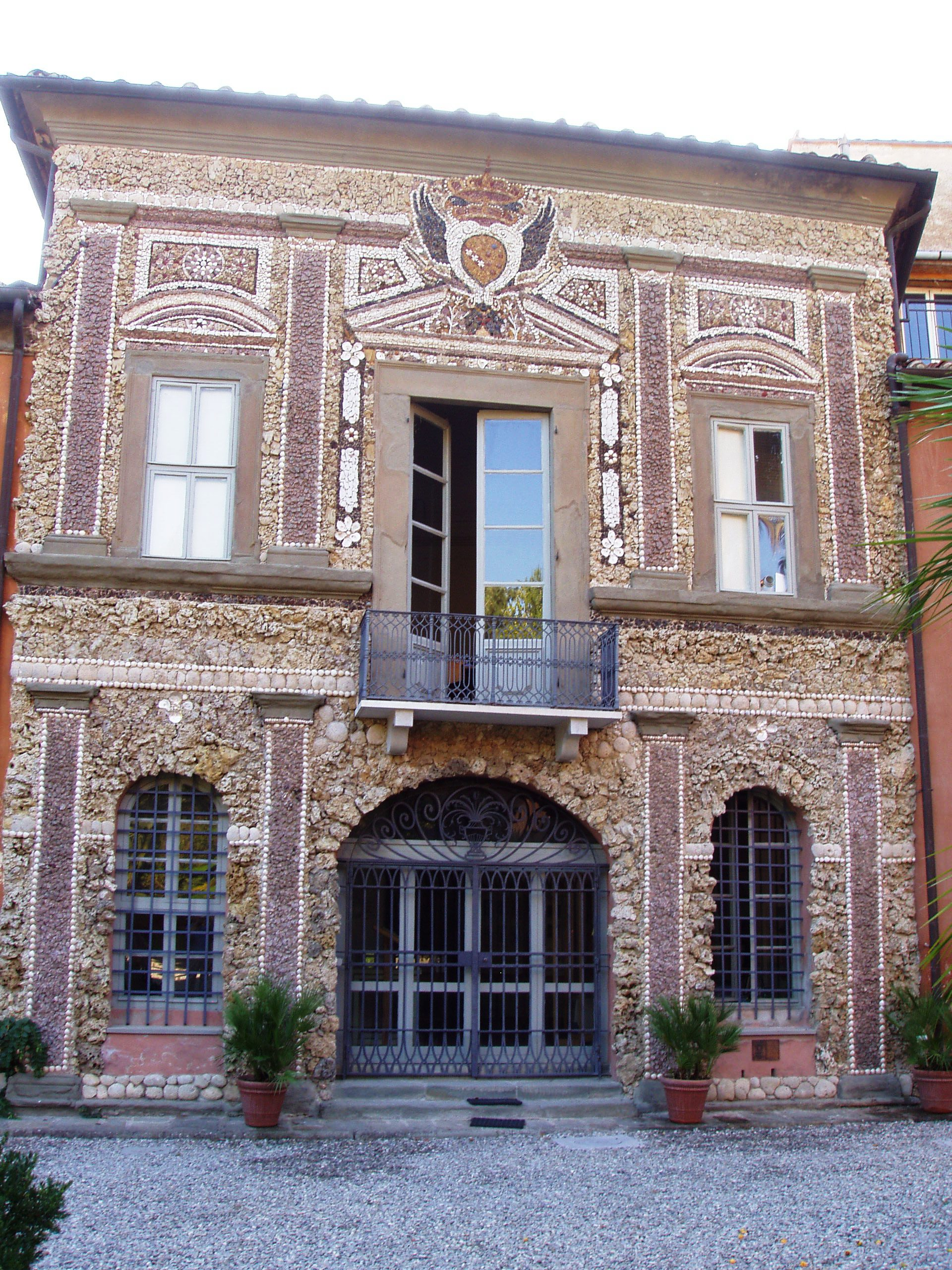
Old institute building.

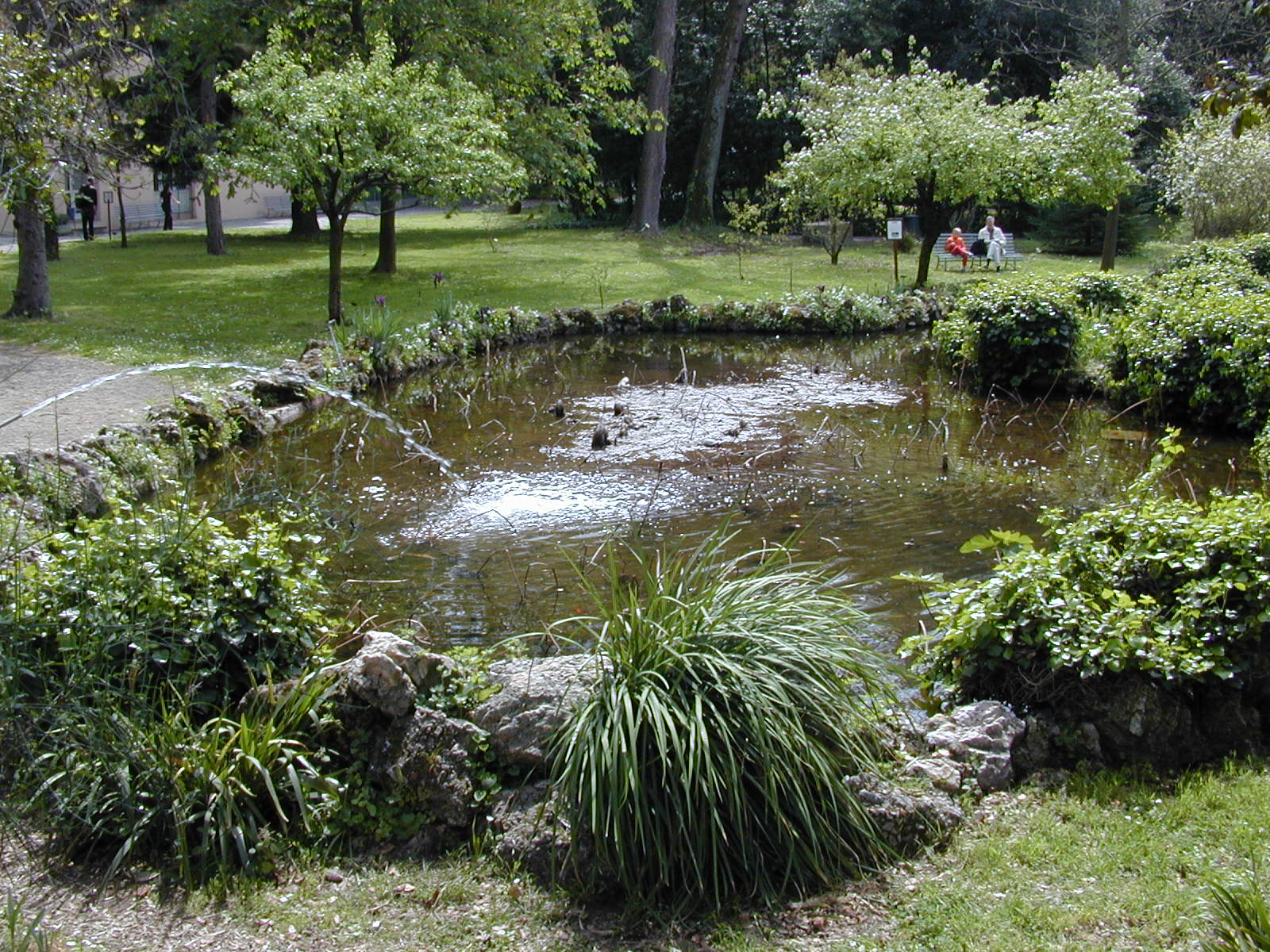
Pond

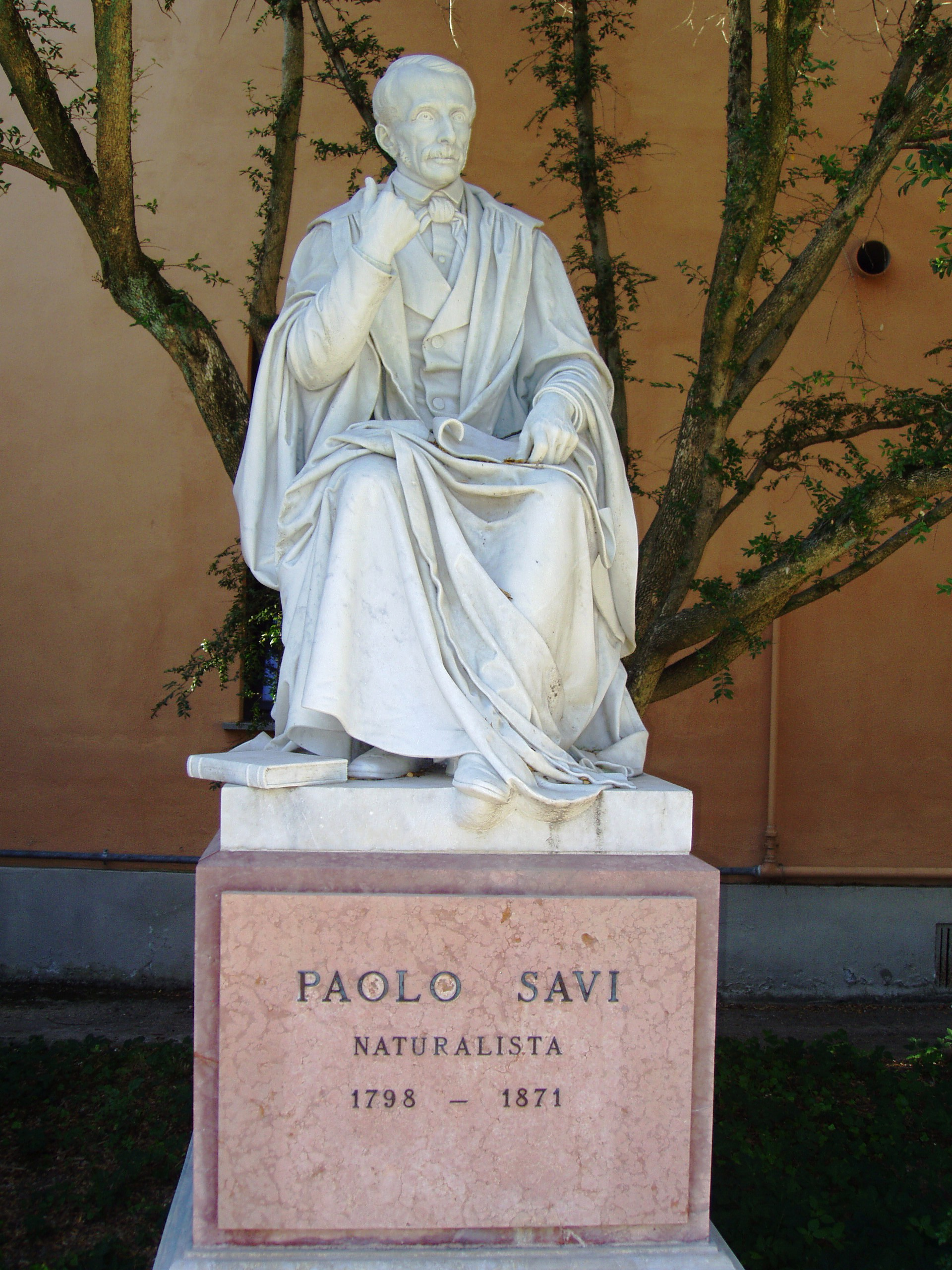
Monument to Italian naturalist Paolo Savi (1798-1871).

== Herbarium ==
The garden houses a herbarium with important historical and recent specimen collections made by Italian botanists. Between 1836 and 1861 the herbarium distributed the exsiccata-like specimen series Flora Etrusca exsiccata.

== See also ==
- List of botanical gardens in Italy
