= Lazzaro Vasari =

Italian painter

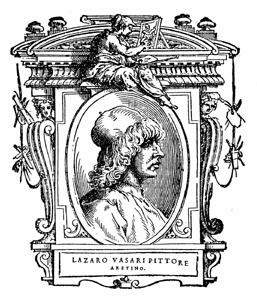
Lazzaro Vasari

Lazzaro Vasari (1399–1468), also known as Lazzaro Taldi and as Lazzaro di Niccolò de' Taldi, was an Italian painter who was born in the Province of Arezzo. His father was a potter, as was Lazzaro Vasari’s son, Giorgio Vasari I. The painter Luca Signorelli (1441–1523) was Lazzaro Vasari’s nephew, and the art historian Giorgio Vasari was his great-grandson.

Lazzaro Vasari’s best-known work is the fresco of Saint Vincent Ferrer in the Basilica of San Domenico in Arezzo, Italy. He died in Arezzo in 1468 and was buried at the Chapel of San Giorgio in the same city.
