= Navicella (mosaic) =

Lost mosaic by Giotto

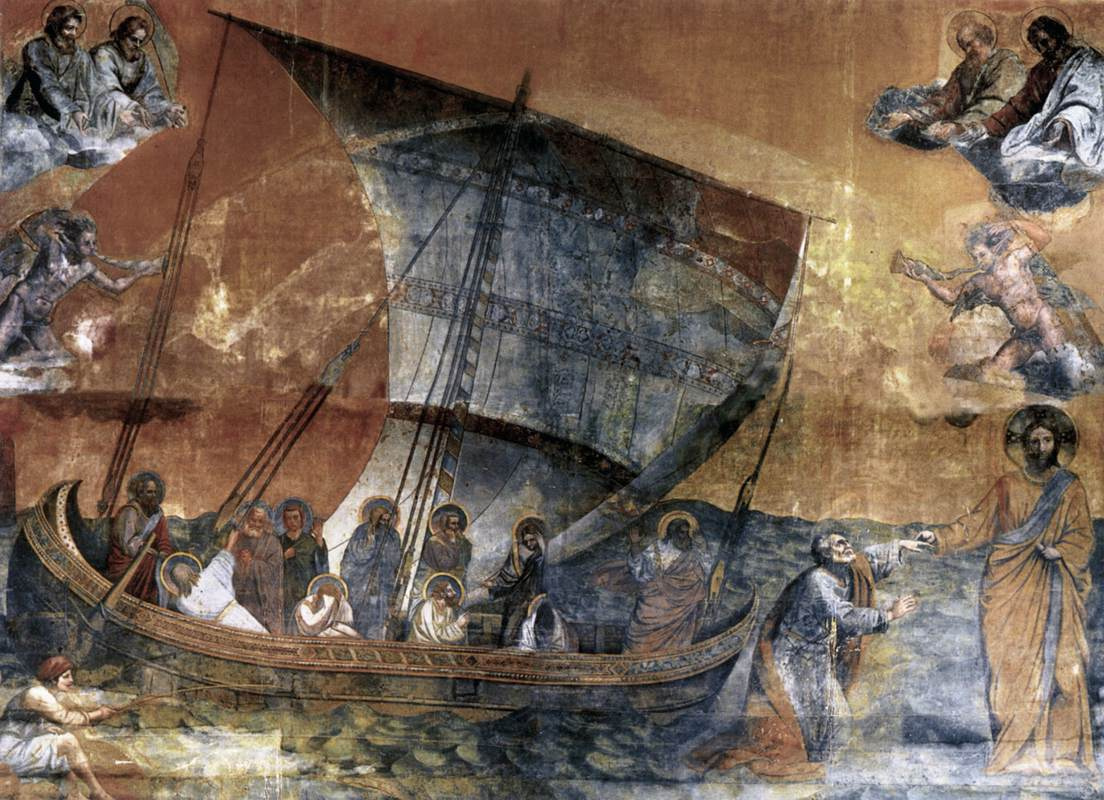
The 1628 full-size copy in oil in the Vatican

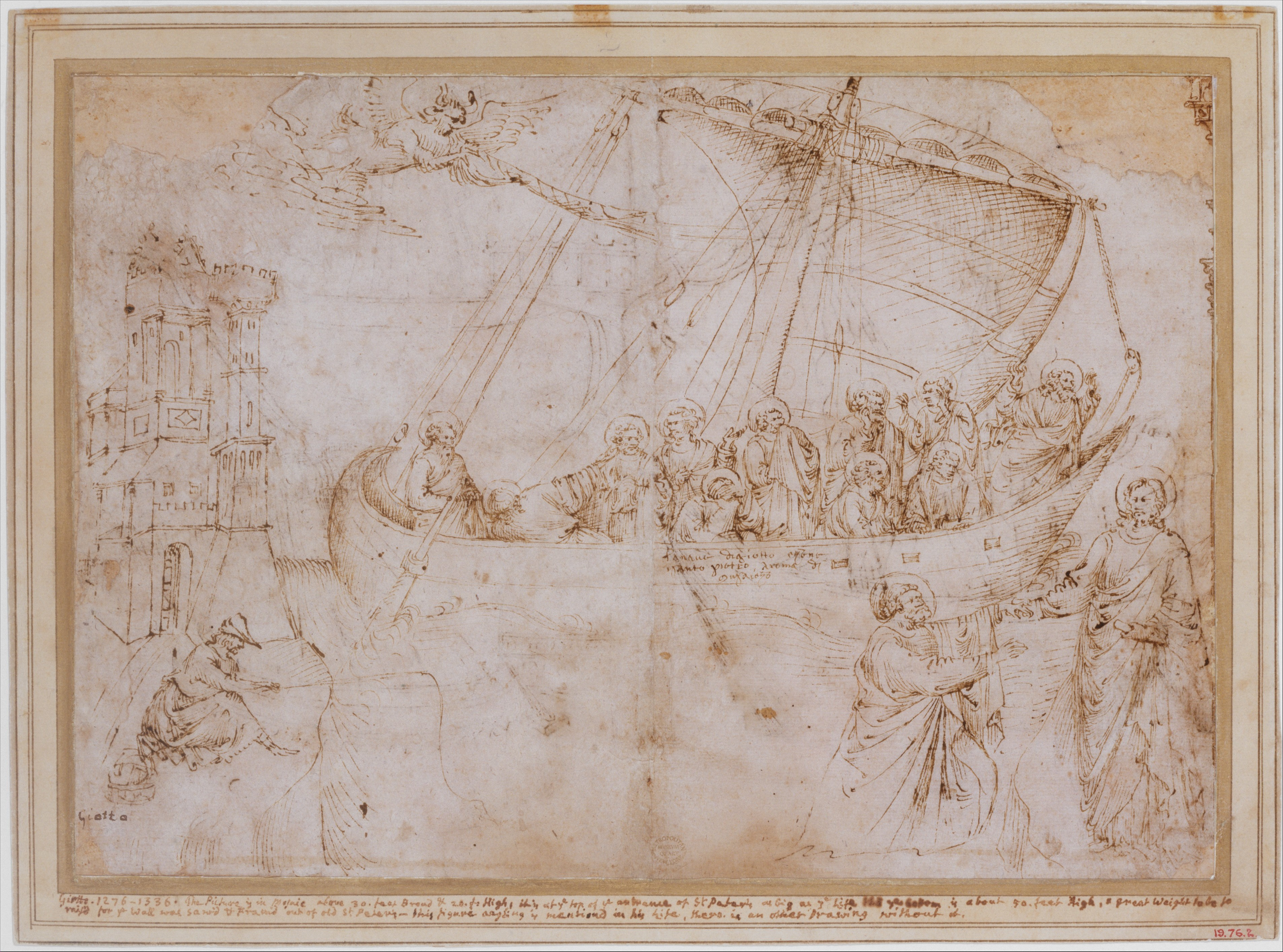
Drawing of the lost mosaic by Parri Spinelli, about 1420, once owned by Vasari.

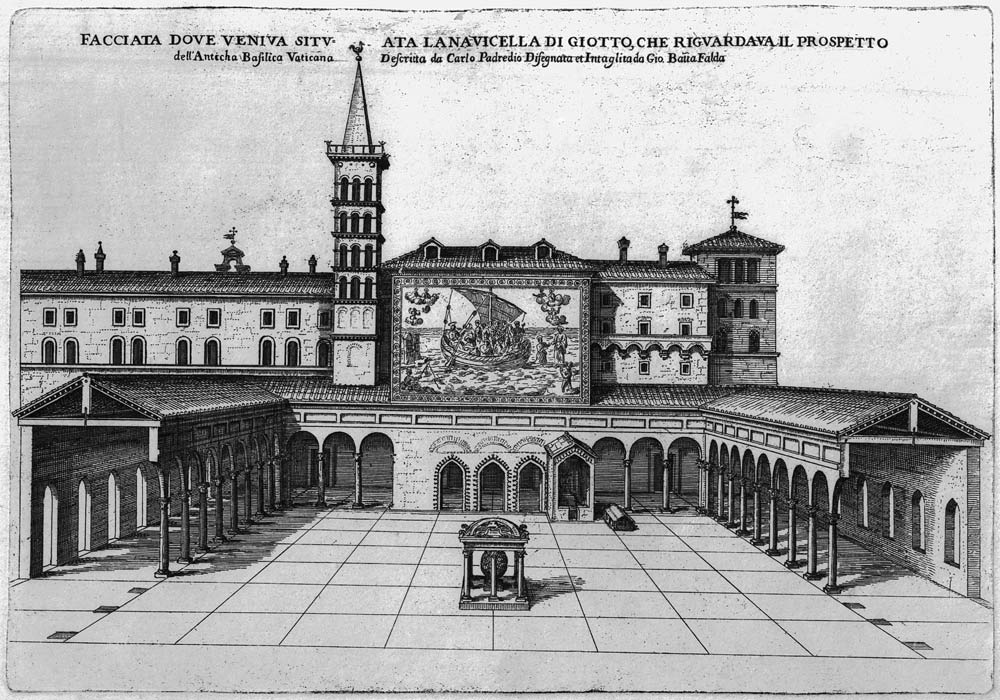
1673 engraving showing the mosaic on Old St. Peter's Basilica

The Navicella (literally "little ship") or Bark of St. Peter, of Old Saint Peter's Basilica in Rome, was a large and famous mosaic by Giotto di Bondone that occupied a large part of the wall above the entrance arcade, facing the main facade of the basilica across the courtyard. It depicted the version from the Gospel of Matthew (Matthew 14:24–32) of Christ walking on the water, the only one of the three gospel accounts where Saint Peter is summoned to join him. It was almost entirely destroyed during the construction of the new Saint Peter's Basilica in the 17th century, but fragments were preserved from the sides of the composition, and what is effectively a new work, incorporating some original fragments, was restored to a position at the centre of the portico of the new building in 1675.

The mosaic, designed to be seen from a distance, was extremely large. A full-scale copy in oil, commissioned by the Vatican from Francesco Berretta in 1628, after much of the work had already been lost round the edges, measures 7.4 by 9.9 metres (24 ft × 32 ft). The full mosaic was probably about 9.4 by 13 metres (31 ft × 43 ft), with an inscription in Latin verse running below the image.

== Description ==
The mosaic was commissioned in 1298 by Cardinal Jacopo Stefaneschi, canon of St. Peter's, whose donor portrait was to the right of Christ's feet. Giotto's mosaic therefore belonged to the preparations of St. Peters for the holy year in 1300. The date of the commission is attested by a document copied in the 17th century. There are no indications of a later dating, nor are there indications that Giotto's mosaic replaced an older one. According to Stefaneschi's obituary of 1347, the work cost 2,200 florins. In addition to an official document from 1298, references to the work by Giotto are found in a Vatican necrology entry for Cardinal Stefaneschi recording his death in 1343, and then the Latin chronicle of Giotto's home city Florence written in the late 14th century by Filippo Villani.

It was rectangular, and positioned so that those leaving the basilica saw it across the courtyard outside the church, and passed under it if they left by the main route. A figure of a man fishing on the shore to the left was thought to be a self-portrait of Giotto, as Vasari's Life records. The composition was dominated by the fishing boat with its large sail, which represented a metaphor for the "Ship of the Church", whose "captain" on earth was Saint Peter and his successors as Pope. It was commissioned at a very difficult time for the Papacy, who was unable even to control the gangsterish nobility of Rome, and had therefore left the city, but the image promised that both church and Papacy were, with the help of Christ, "unsinkable". Of the eleven figures still in the boat, it has been suggested that the one holding the tiller is (anachronistically in terms of the Gospels) Saint Paul. In the sky, two almost naked classical style "wind god" figures blow through horns or funnels, one from each side, below pairs of haloed male figures. Giotto would have produced drawings for specialist mosaic workers to recreate on the wall; whether he had any further involvement as the work was created is unknown.

The subject is depicted elsewhere in medieval art of the period, and later works like frescos in the "Spanish Chapel" of Santa Maria Novella in Florence, and in the Brancacci Chapel by Masaccio (or perhaps his colleague Masolino), and one of the bronze relief panels on Ghiberti's north doors of the Florence Baptistery. It was also used on Papal coins and medals, though usually with Peter in the boat, often as the only figure. It was the only modern (post-classical) work described in Alberti's De Pictura. Such a large depiction of a maritime scene was unprecedented in marine art, at least since classical times.

The arcade across the courtyard and its mosaic were at first unaffected by the protracted and complicated rebuilding of the main basilica, but in the 17th century the mosaic underwent a complicated series of four moves and restorations or remodellings in 1610, 1618, 1629 and 1674/75 which finally took it to its present size, condition and location above the main door inside the portico of the new church.

== Fragments ==
Only two bust-length figures of angels in roundels survive from the original; one remains in the Vatican, while the other was given to the church of San Pietro Ispano in Boville Ernica in 1610, when the mosaic was first removed from its original place. The former is considerably restored (in 1924, 1950 and 1975–80), and was discovered underneath later work in 1911 (or 1924). The Boville Ernica fragment consisted of little original substance and was completely restored between 1888 and 1911. Despite none of the copies of the original including these figures it is thought they were part of the original, probably in a border. There are thought to be some patches of original work remaining in the mosaic still in St Peter's, which is now semi-circular with a straight bottom edge to fit into a lunette. Areas where original work seems to survive are in "the gilded edge of the ship, the sail blown by the wind, various sections of some apostles".

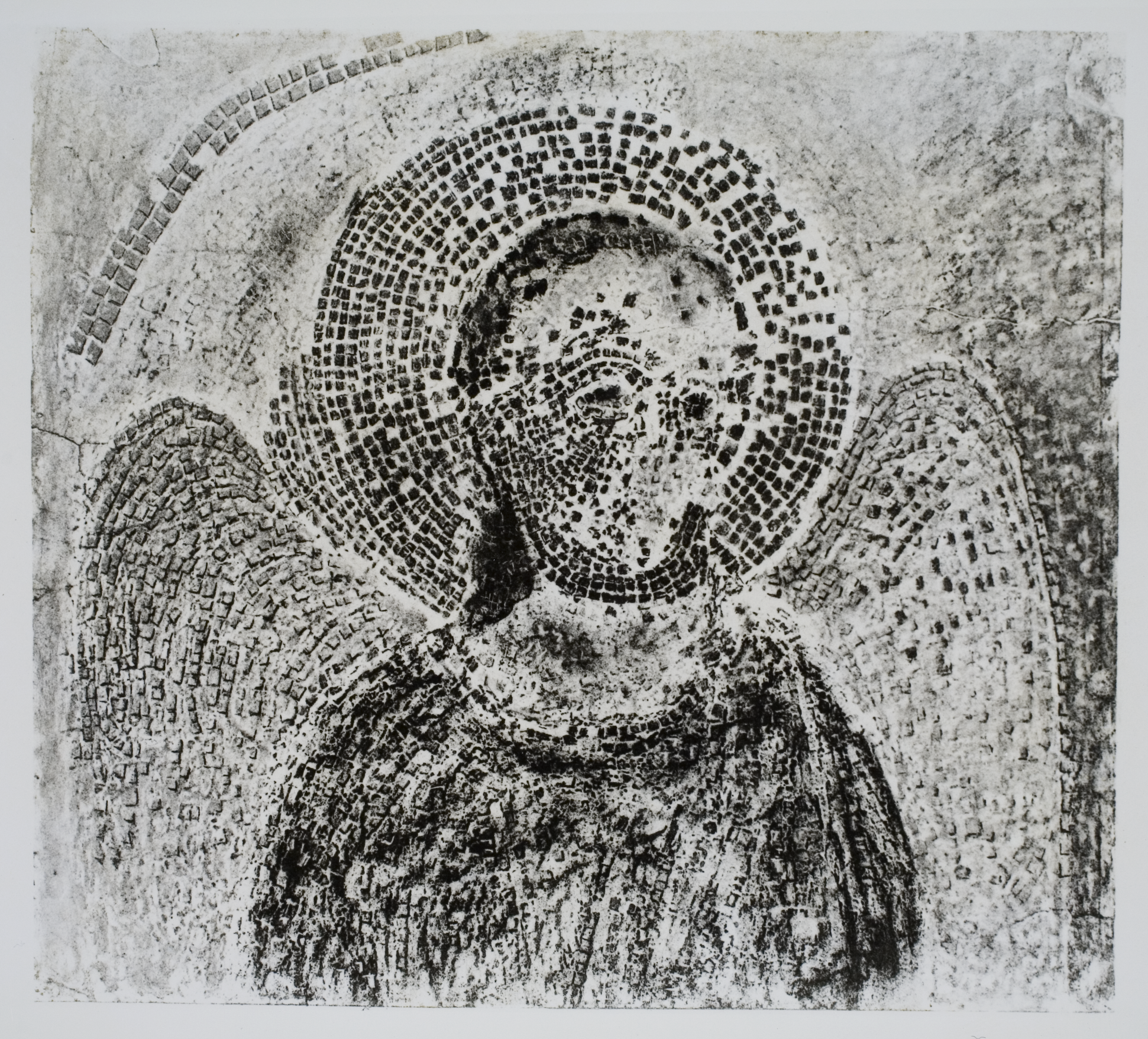
Fragment in Boville Ernica, before restoration

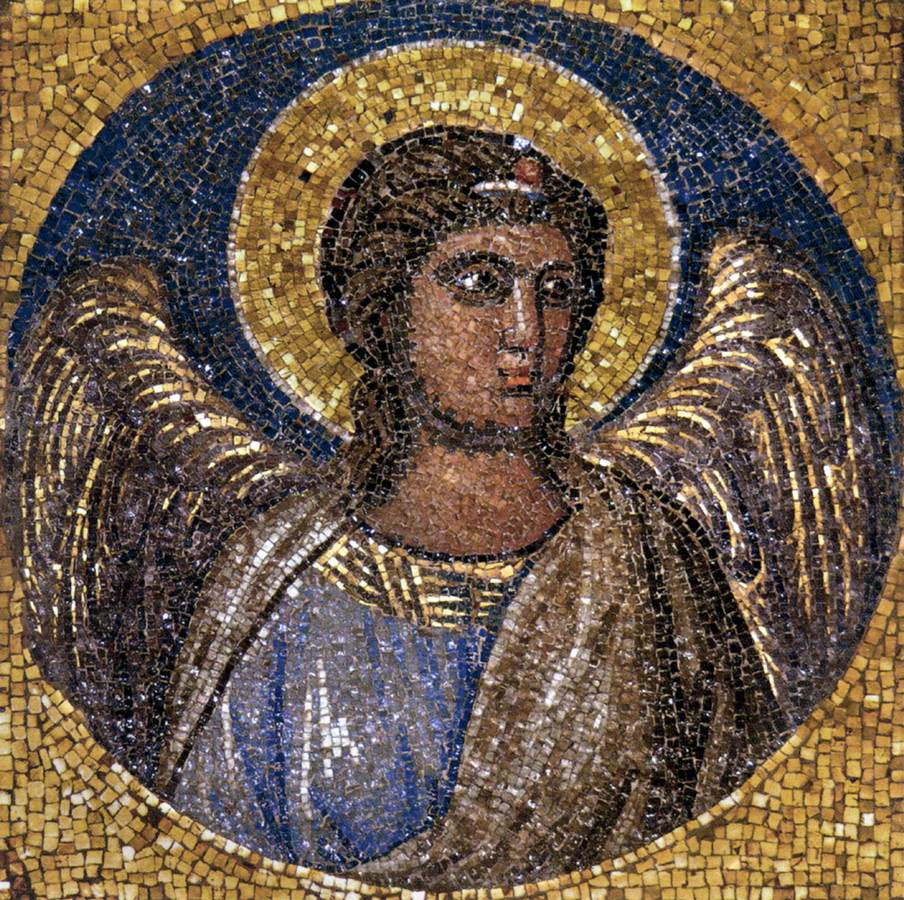
Fragment in Boville Ernica, after restoration

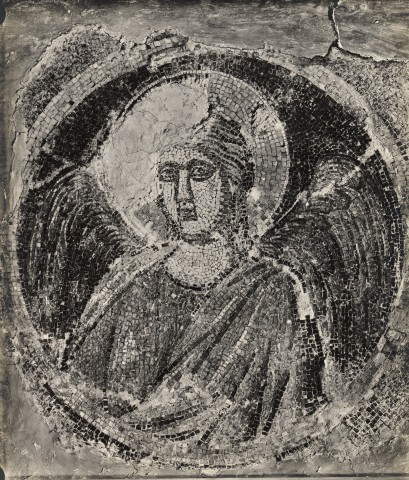
Fragment in the Vatican, before restoration

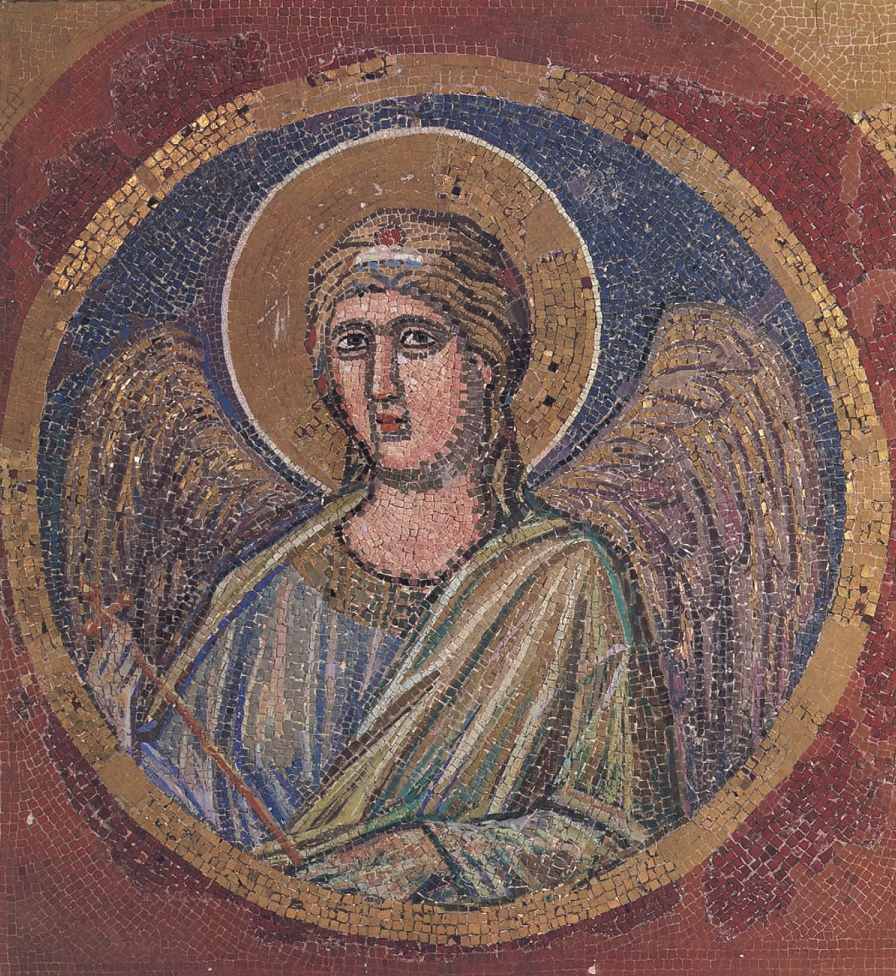
Fragment in the Vatican, after restoration

== Style ==
The style of the work can now only be judged from the two angel fragments, restored as they are. Vasari's description emphasized the varied reactions of the figures in the boat as they saw Peter sinking below the waves, and the patient expression on the face of the fisherman on the shore, who, like Pieter Bruegel's ploughman in Landscape with the Fall of Icarus seems to ignore the dramatic scene on the water in concentrating on his own task. But, as Svetlana Alpers has shown, these were the terms in which Vasari tended to describe large history paintings he admired, though Alberti's description in De pictura also "treats ...[the work] as a psychological narrative".

Modern scholars, working from the fragments, emphasize the influence of the major Roman artist of the day, Pietro Cavallini, who was also patronized by Cardinal Stefanesci, and of the Late Antique and Early Medieval works to be seen in Rome. According to John White: "The relatively schematic, linear quality of much late-thirteenth- and early-fourteenth-century work is wholly absent. The impressionistic technique and range of colour both derive from the fifth century. It is impossible to say how much this technique reflects the ideas of Giotto himself and how much those of the skilled mosaicists working under him. The two heads are, however, closely related both to the work of Cavallini, whose art still dominated the Roman scene, and to the basic type of physiognomy developed on the walls of the Arena Chapel."

== Copies ==
There are a number of records of the original design in drawings and prints—at least 17 are recorded. The earliest are a number of drawings attributed to the Florentine artist Parri Spinelli (c. 1387–1453), of which the most detailed is in the Metropolitan Museum of Art in New York, and others are in Chantilly, Cleveland, Ohio and Bayonne. However, the variations between these, and other drawings by Spinelli of surviving works, show that he was in the habit of making rather loose interpretations of works that he recorded in drawings. Most later copies date from after parts of the mosaic were already lost, and none form a complete record of the full design. Some prints, like an engraving by Nicolas Beatrizet of about 1559, are reversed (mirror-image) copies.

== Gospel account ==
Only in the account in Matthew 14:24–33 does Peter also leave the boat to walk on the waves:

But the boat was now in the midst of the sea, distressed by the waves; for the wind was contrary.

And in the fourth watch of the night he came unto them, walking upon the sea. And when the disciples saw him walking on the sea, they were troubled, saying, It is a ghost; and they cried out for fear. But straightway Jesus spake unto them, saying Be of good cheer; it is I; be not afraid. And Peter answered him and said, Lord, if it be thou, bid me come unto thee upon the waters. And he said, Come. And Peter went down from the boat, and walked upon the waters to come to Jesus. But when he saw the wind, he was afraid; and beginning to sink, he cried out, saying, Lord, save me. And immediately Jesus stretched forth his hand, and took hold of him, and saith unto him, O thou of little faith, wherefore didst thou doubt? And when they were gone up into the boat, the wind ceased.

And they that were in the boat worshipped him, saying, Of a truth thou art the Son of God.

== Vision of St Catherine of Siena ==
On the evening of January 29, 1380, at the time of Vespers, Saint Catherine of Siena, who had been contemplating the mosaic for some hours, suddenly felt as if "the ship had fallen off and landed on her shoulders" with "unbearable weight". She understood that she was to give her life for the Church. She apparently never walked again, and died three months later.
