= San Sebastiano, Mantua =

Church building in Mantua, Italy

Coordinates: 45°09′03.15″N 10°47′17.69″E

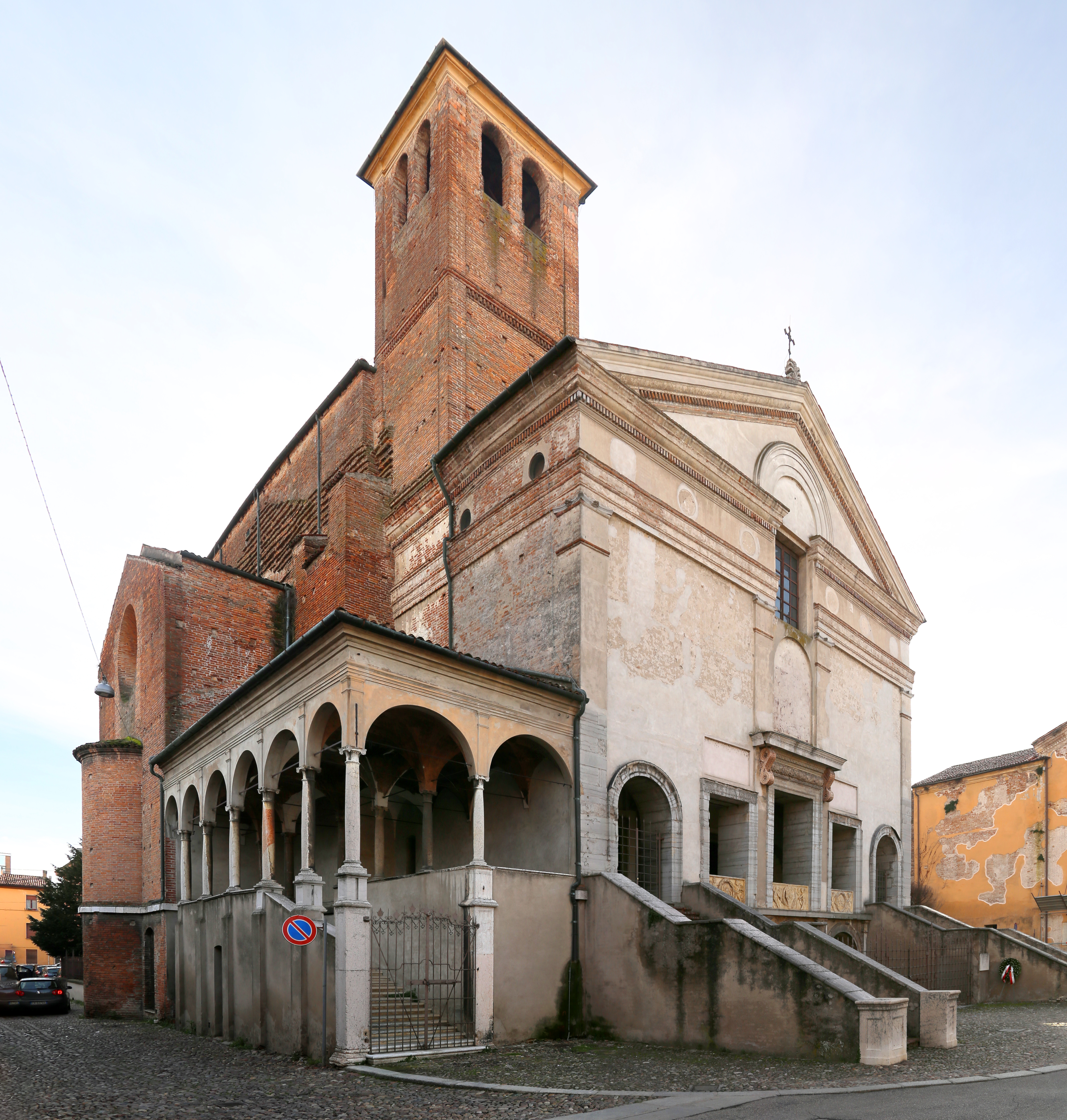
Façade of San Sebastiano church.

San Sebastiano is an Early Renaissance church in Mantua, Northern Italy. Begun in 1460 according to the designs of Leon Battista Alberti, it was left partially completed in the mid-1470s, by which time construction had slowed and was no longer being directed by Alberti. As a consequence, little remains of Alberti’s work apart from the plan, which is considered one of the earliest and most significant examples of the Renaissance's centrally-planned churches. The plan is in the shape of a Greek cross, with three identical arms centering apses, under a central cross-vaulted space without any interior partitions. The church sits on a ground-level crypt which was intended to serve as a mausoleum for the Gonzaga family.

The complete absence of columns in the façade signified for Rudolf Wittkower a decisive turning-point in Alberti's interpretation of architecture, moving beyond his statements in De Re Aedificatoria where he considered the column the noblest ornament of building. The façade concealing a narthex that runs the full width of the structure is precisely as wide as its height from the entrance level to the apex of the pediment; it may be fitted with the perfect geometry of the square. The temple front has been converted by Alberti into wall-architecture, as Wittkower noted, and a complete series of pilasters, like pillars embedded in the wall, has been elided to the two outermost, and the two flanking Pellegrino Ardizoni's clumsy doorway, which overlaps them and ill suits its space.

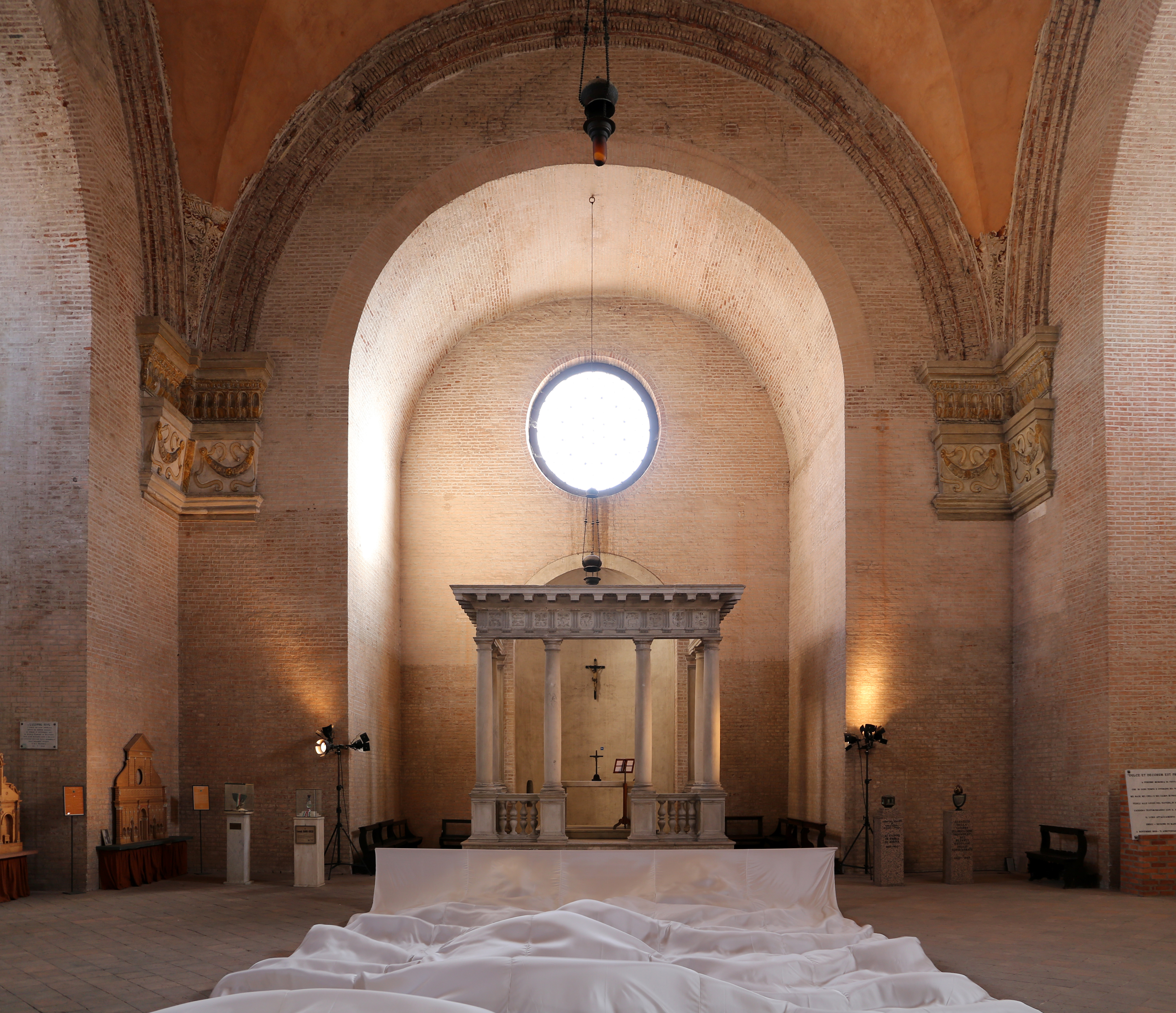
Inside view.

A surviving letter of 1470 from the patron, Ludovico III Gonzaga, Marquis of Mantua, to the on-site architect agreeing with Alberti's proposal to reduce the number of pilasters on the portico illuminates Alberti's plan of 1460.

The two outer staircases were added in the twentieth century; prior to 1925 old photographs show the entrance was a single stair to the quattrocento loggia appended to Alberti's design. Wittkower demonstrates that Alberti's plan comprised a set of stairs the full width of the façade leading to five doors (three of which have been filled in as dysfunctional balconies).

The most unexpected motif in the façade is the central break in the entablature presented by the window opening, doubtless intended to be arch-headed under the arched entablature that joins the outer sections, a motif that Wittkower conjectured Alberti knew from the side elevations of the Roman triumphal arch at Orange.

== See also ==
- Tempio Malatestiano
