= Sinisgalli (surname) =

Sinisgalli is an Italian surname. Notable people with this surname include:

- Leonardo Sinisgalli (1908–1981), Italian poet and art critic
- Rocco Sinisgalli (born 1947), Italian art historian, writer and architectural theoretician
