= De pictura =

1435 treatise by Leon Battista Alberti

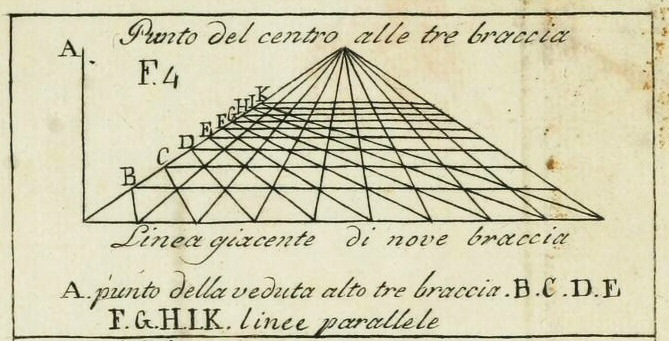
Figure from the 1804 edition of Della picture showing the vanishing point

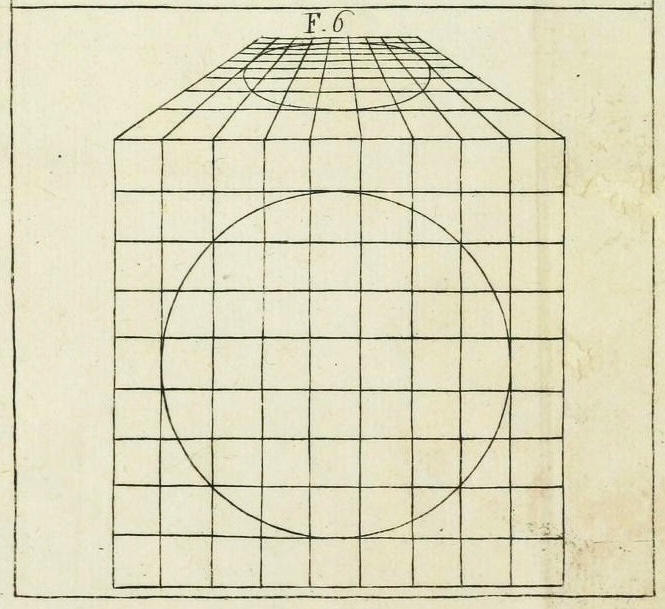
Rendition of Alberti's description of how a circle projected as an ellipse

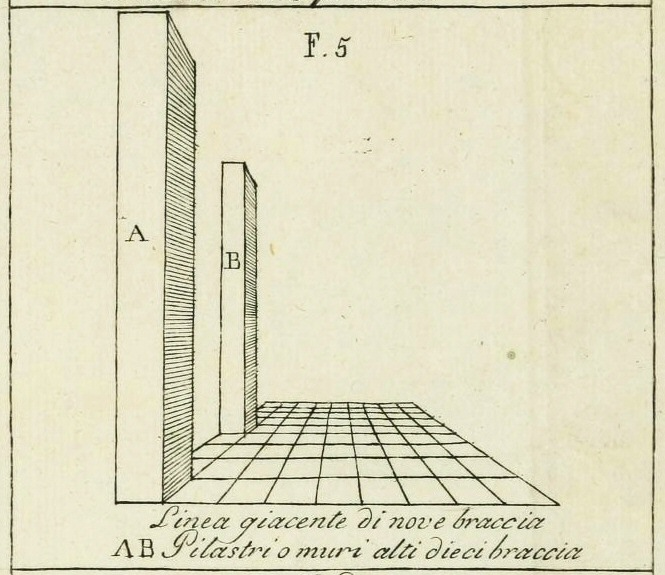
Figure showing pillars in perspective on a grid

De pictura (English: "On Painting"), also Della picture, is a treatise or commentarii written by the Italian humanist and artist Leon Battista Alberti. The first version, composed in Latin in 1435, was not published until 1450. It is one of his three treatises on art; the other two are De statua and De re aedificatoria, that would form the Renaissance concept for the fine arts: painting, sculpture, and architecture.

== Context ==
Alberti was a member of Florentine family exiled in the 14th century, who was able to return in Florence only from 1434, in the following of the Papal court during the Council of Florence. Here he knew contemporary art innovators such as Filippo Brunelleschi, Donatello and Masaccio, with whom he shared an interest for Renaissance humanism and classical art.

Alberti was the first post-classical writer to produce a work of art theory, as opposed to works about the function of religious art or art techniques, and reflected the developing Italian Renaissance art of his day. As an artist, architect, poet and philosopher, he revolutionized the history of art with his theories of perspective in De pictura. Inspired by the order and beauty inherent in nature, his groundbreaking work sets out the principles of distance, dimension and proportion; instructs the painter on how to use the rules of composition, representation, light and colour to create work that is graceful and pleasing to the eye; and stipulates the moral and artistic pre-requisites of the successful painter.

De pictura had an immediate and profound influence on Italian Renaissance artists including Ghiberti, Fra Angelico and Veneziano and on later figures such as Leonardo da Vinci, and remains a compelling theory of art.

== Work ==
=== Contents ===
Book I: a simple introduction for young boys, in preparation for studying painting

Book II: a survey of types of painting for teenage trainees in a workshop

Book III: advice to the adult painter on how to perfect his skill

=== Approach ===
De pictura aimed to describe systematically the figurative arts through "geometry". Alberti divided painting into three parts:

- Circumscriptio (Italian: disegno), consisting in drawing the bodies' contour
- Compositio (commensuratio in the Italian version of the treatise), including tracing the lines joining the bodies
- Receptio luminum (color), taking into consideration colors and light.

The treatise contained an analysis of all the techniques and painting theories known at the time, in this surpassing medieval works such as The book of Art by Cennino Cennini (1390). De pictura also includes the first description of linear geometric perspective around 1416; Alberti credited the discovery to Brunelleschi, and dedicated the 1435 edition to him.

Alberti argued that multi-figure history painting was the noblest form of art, as being the most difficult, which required mastery of all the others, because it was a visual form of history, and because it had the greatest potential to move the viewer. He placed emphasis on the ability to depict the interactions between the figures by gesture and expression.

De pictura relied heavily on references to art in classical literature; in fact Giotto's huge Navicella in mosaic at Old St. Peter's Basilica in Rome (now effectively lost) was the only modern (post-classical) work described in it.

== Influence ==
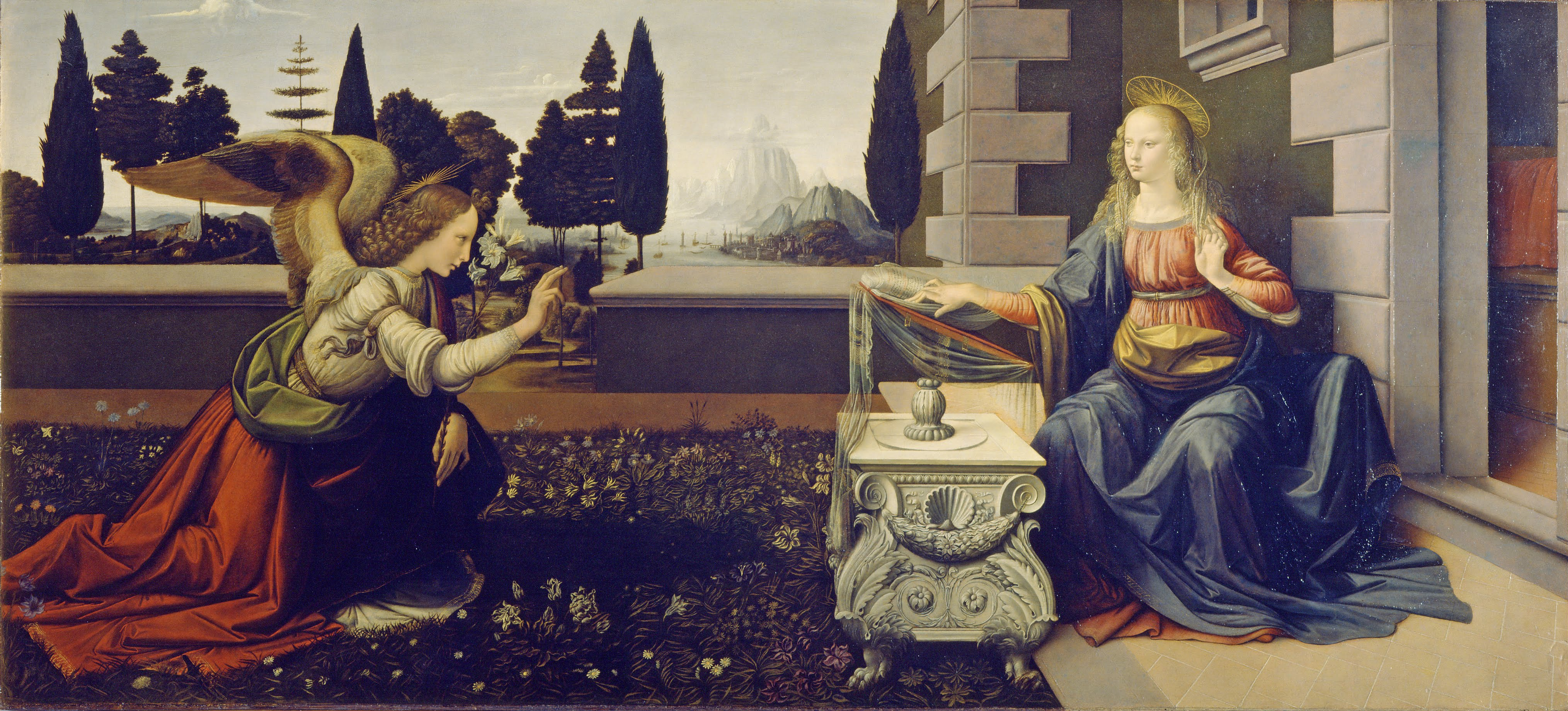
The accurate perspective in Leonardo da Vinci's paintings such as his Annunciation (1475–1480) epitomizes the construction described in Alberti's De pictura.

De pictura influenced the work of artists including Donatello, Ghiberti, Botticelli, and Ghirlandaio. His treatment of perspective was the most influential of his recommendations, being powerfully implemented by Leonardo da Vinci, and through him to the whole Italian Renaissance.

Alberti made at least 29 uses of Pliny the Elder's Natural History, deriving his key themes of simplicity and seriousness directly from Pliny. For example, Alberti advised artists to use colour with restraint, and to paint in the effect of gold rather than using actual gold in their paintings. Gold did indeed vanish from Italian paintings of the second part of the 15th century. Artists however found their own ways to paint with restraint, rather than following Alberti's actual instructions directly. Similarly, he encouraged artists to add black when modelling shapes, rather than only adding white as Cennino Cennini had advised in his c. 1390 Il Libro dell'Arte. This advice made Italian renaissance paintings more sombre. Alberti was here perhaps following Pliny's description of the dark varnish used by Apelles.

== Bibliography ==
=== Editions ===
- 1435/6, Della Pittura (in the Tuscan dialect of Italian)
- 1439–41, De pictura (in Latin)

=== Translations and critical editions ===
- Spencer, J (1956, 1966) On Painting. New Haven.
- Grayson, Cecil (1972) On Painting and On Sculpture: The Latin texts of De Pictura and De Statua. Phaidon.
- Sinisgalli, Rocco (2011) On Painting. A New Translation and Critical Edition. Cambridge University Press.
