= Leon Battista Alberti =

Italian architect and author (1404-1472)

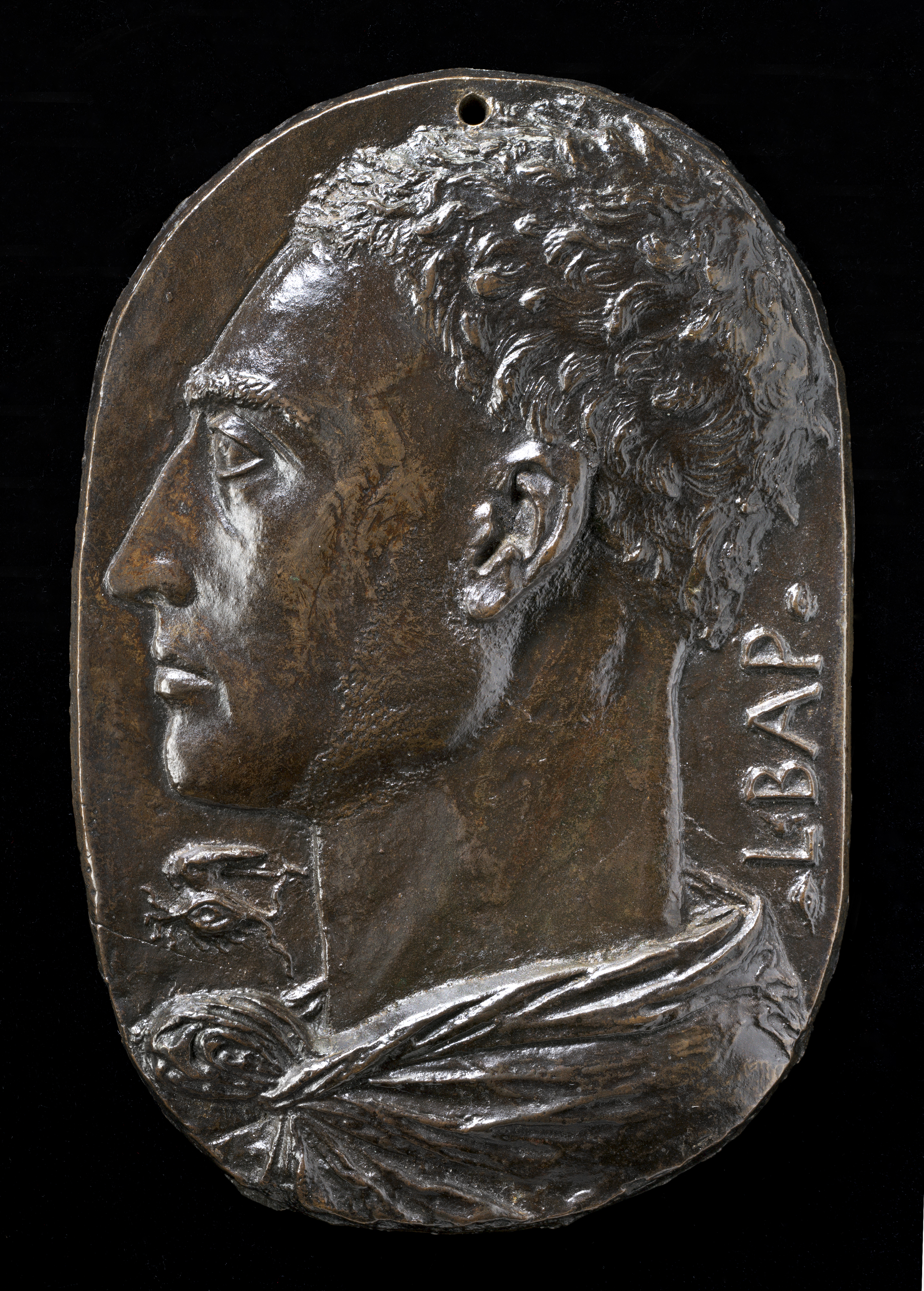
- Presumed self-portrait of Alberti
- Born: 14 February 1404; Genoa, Republic of Genoa
- Died: 25 April 1472 (aged 68); Rome, Papal States
- Known for: Architecture, linguistics, poetry
- Notable work: Tempio Malatestiano, Palazzo Rucellai, Santa Maria Novella, Basilica of Sant'Andrea
- Movement: Italian Renaissance

Leon Battista Alberti (Italian: [leombatˈtista alˈbɛɾti]; 14 February 1404 – 25 April 1472) was an Italian Renaissance humanist author, artist, architect, poet, priest, linguist, philosopher, and cryptographer; he epitomised the nature of those identified now as polymaths. He is considered the founder of European cryptography, a claim he shares with Johannes Trithemius.

He is often considered primarily an architect. However, according to James Beck, "to single out one of Leon Battista's 'fields' over others as somehow functionally independent and self-sufficient is of no help at all to any effort to characterize Alberti's extensive explorations in the fine arts". Although Alberti is known mostly as an artist, he was also a mathematician and made significant contributions to that field. Among the most famous buildings he designed are the churches of San Sebastiano (1460) and Sant'Andrea (1472), both in Mantua.

Alberti's life was told in Giorgio Vasari's Lives of the Most Excellent Painters, Sculptors, and Architects.

== Biography ==
=== Early life ===
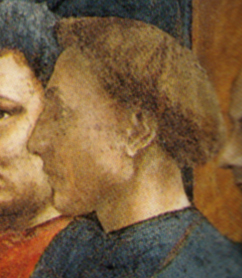
A portrait of Alberti by Filippino Lippi is thought to exist in the Brancacci Chapel, as part of Lippi's completion of the Masaccio painting, the Raising of the Son of Theophilus and St. Peter Enthroned.

Leon Battista Alberti was born in 1404 in Genoa. His mother was Bianca Fieschi. His father, Lorenzo di Benedetto Alberti, was a wealthy Florentine who had been exiled from his own city but was allowed to return in 1428. Alberti was sent to boarding school in Padua, then studied law at Bologna. He lived for a time in Florence, then in 1431 travelled to Rome, where he took holy orders and entered the service of the papal court. During this time, he studied the ancient ruins, which excited his interest in architecture and strongly influenced the form of the buildings that he designed.

Leon Battista Alberti was thought to be a tall, strong athlete skilled in horseback riding, gifted in many ways. He distinguished himself as a writer while still a child at school, and by the age of twenty had written a play that was successfully passed off as a genuine piece of Classical literature. In 1435 he began his first major written work, Della pittura, which was inspired by the burgeoning pictorial art in Florence in the early fifteenth century. In this work, he analysed the nature of painting and explored the elements of perspective, composition, and colour.

In 1438, he began to focus more on architecture and was encouraged by the Marchese Leonello d'Este of Ferrara, for whom he built a small triumphal arch to support an equestrian statue of Leonello's father. In 1447 Alberti became architectural advisor to Pope Nicholas V and was involved in several projects at the Vatican.

=== First major commission ===
His first major architectural commission was in 1446 for the façade of the Rucellai Palace in Florence. This was followed in 1450 by a commission from Sigismondo Malatesta to transform the Gothic church of San Francesco in Rimini into a memorial chapel, the Tempio Malatestiano. In Florence, he designed the upper parts of the façade for the Dominican church of Santa Maria Novella, famously bridging the nave and lower aisles with two ornately inlaid scrolls, solving a visual problem and setting a precedent to be followed by architects of churches for four hundred years. In 1452, he completed De re aedificatoria, a treatise on architecture, using as its basis the work of Vitruvius and influenced by the ancient roman buildings. The work was not published until 1485. It was followed in 1464 by his less influential work, De statua, in which he examines sculpture. Alberti's only known sculpture is a self-portrait medallion, sometimes attributed to Pisanello.

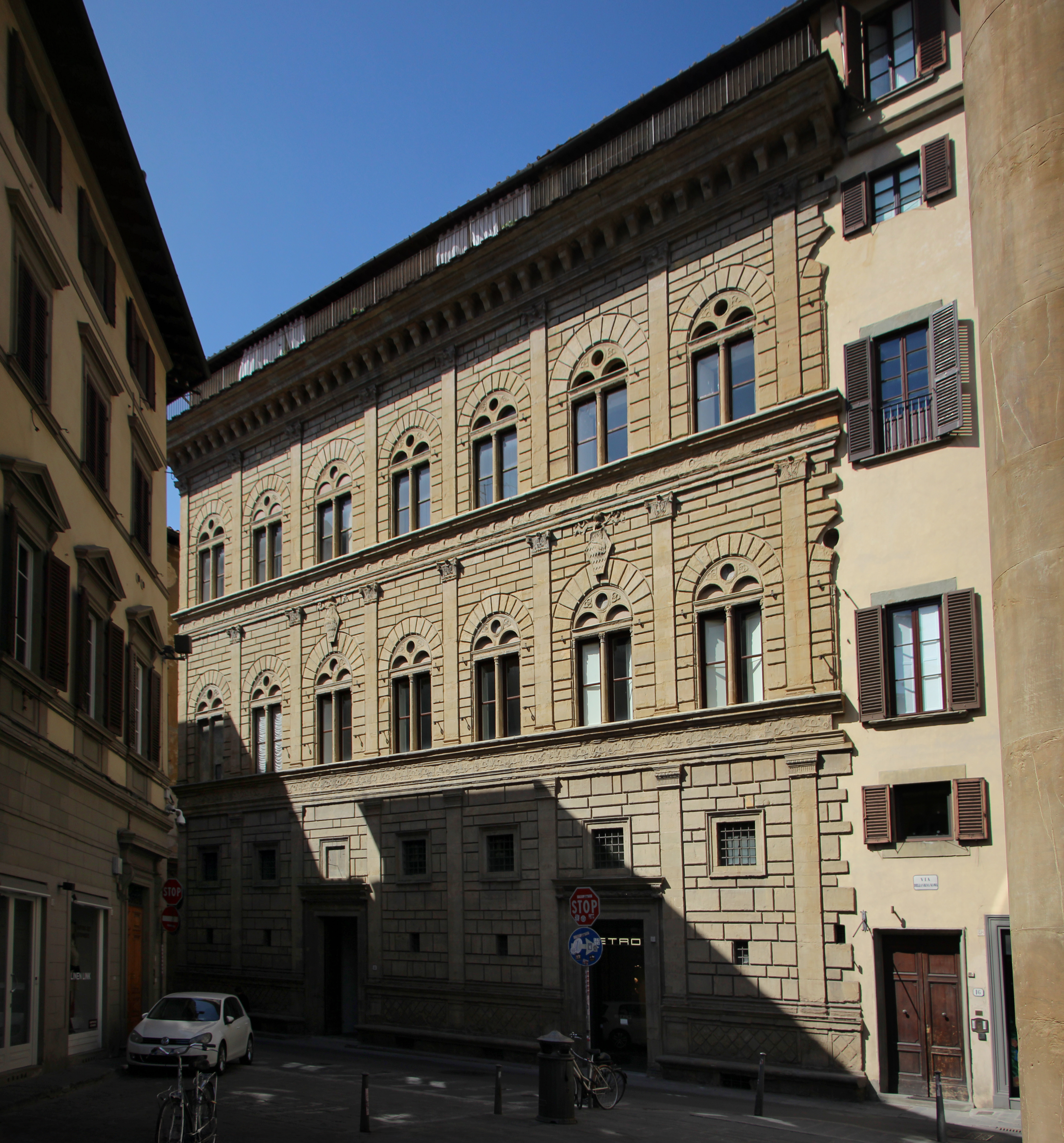
Palazzo Rucellai

Alberti was employed to design two churches in Mantua, San Sebastiano, which was never completed and for which Alberti's intention can only be speculated upon, and the Basilica of Sant'Andrea. The design for the latter church was completed in 1471, a year before Alberti's death: the construction was completed after his death and is considered as his most significant work.

=== Alberti as artist ===
As an artist, Alberti distinguished himself from the contemporary ordinary craftsmen educated in workshops. He was a humanist who studied Aristotle and Plotinus. He was among the rapidly growing group of intellectuals and artists who at that time were supported by the courts of nobility. As a member of a noble family and as part of the Roman curia, Alberti enjoyed special status. He was a welcomed guest at the Este court in Ferrara, and spent time with the soldier-prince Federico III da Montefeltro in Urbino. The Duke of Urbino was a shrewd military commander, who generously funded artists. Alberti planned to dedicate his treatise on architecture to him.

Among Alberti's minor but pioneering studies were an essay on cryptography, De componendis cifris, and the first Italian grammar. He collaborated with the Florentine cosmographer Paolo Toscanelli in astronomy, a science close to geography at that time. He also wrote a small Latin work on geography, Descriptio urbis Romae (The Panorama of the City of Rome). Just a few years before his death, Alberti completed De iciarchia (On Ruling the Household), a dialogue about Florence during the Medici rule.

Alberti took holy orders and never married. He loved animals and had a pet dog, a mongrel, about whom he wrote a panegyric (Canis). Vasari describes Alberti as "an admirable citizen, a man of culture... a friend of talented men, open and courteous with everyone. He always lived honourably and like the gentleman he was." Alberti died in Rome on 25 April 1472 at the age of 68.

== Publications ==
Alberti considered mathematics as the foundation of arts and sciences. "To make clear my exposition in writing this brief commentary on painting," Alberti began his treatise, Della Pittura (On Painting) dedicated to Brunelleschi, "I will take first from the mathematicians those things with which my subject is concerned."

Della pittura (also known in Latin as De Pictura) relied on the study classical optics to approach the perspective in artistic and architectural representations. Alberti was well-versed in the sciences of his age. His knowledge of optics was connected to the tradition of the Kitab al-manazir (The Optics; De aspectibus) of the Arab polymath Alhazen (Ibn al-Haytham, d. c. 1041), which was transmitted by Franciscan optical workshops of the thirteenth-century Perspectivae traditions of scholars such as Roger Bacon, John Peckham, and Witelo (similar influences are also traceable in the third commentary of Lorenzo Ghiberti, Commentario terzo).

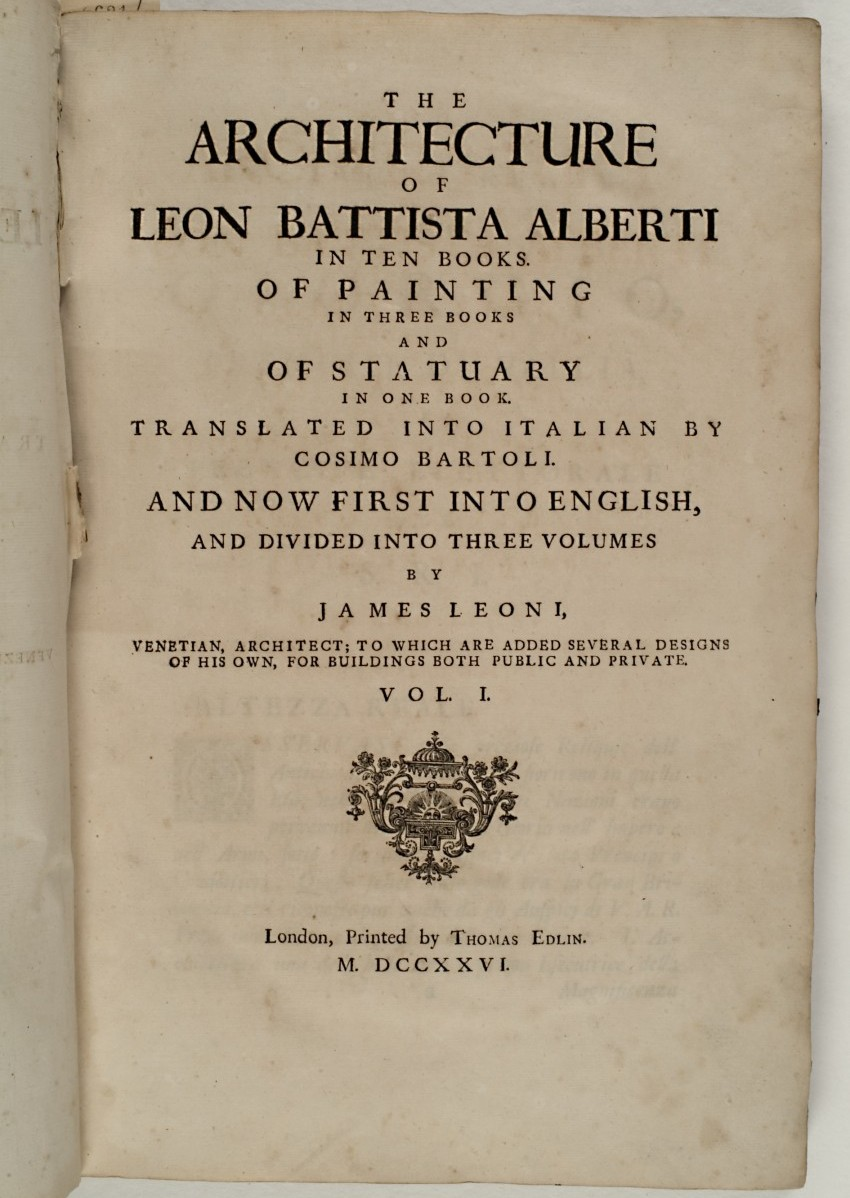
English title page of the first edition of Giacomo Leoni's translation of Alberti's De Re Aedificatoria (1452); the book is bilingual, with the Italian version being printed on the left and the English version printed on the right.

In both Della pittura and De statua, Alberti stressed that "all steps of learning should be sought from nature". The ultimate aim of an artist is to imitate nature. Painters and sculptors strive "through by different skills, at the same goal, namely that as nearly as possible the work they have undertaken shall appear to the observer to be similar to the real objects of nature". However, Alberti did not mean that artists should imitate nature objectively, as it is, but the artist should be especially attentive to beauty, "for in painting beauty is as pleasing as it is necessary". The work of art is, according to Alberti, so constructed that it is impossible to take anything away from it or to add anything to it, without impairing the beauty of the whole. Beauty was for Alberti "the harmony of all parts in relation to one another," and subsequently "this concord is realized in a particular number, proportion, and arrangement demanded by harmony". Alberti's thoughts on harmony were not new—they could be traced back to Pythagoras—but he set them in a fresh context, which fit in well with the contemporary aesthetic discourse.

In Rome, Alberti spent considerable time studying its ancient sites, ruins, and arts. His detailed observations, included in his De re aedificatoria (1452, On the Art of Building), were inspired by the essay De architectura written by the Roman architect and engineer Vitruvius (fl. 46–30 BC). Alberti's work was the first architectural treatise of the Renaissance. It covered a wide range of subjects, from history to town planning, from engineering to the aesthetics. De re aedificatoria, a large and expensive book, was not published until 1485, after which it became a major reference for architects. However, the book was written "not only for craftsmen but also for anyone interested in the noble arts", as Alberti put it. Originally published in Latin, the first Italian edition came out in 1546. and the standard Italian edition by Cosimo Bartoli was published in 1550. Pope Nicholas V, to whom Alberti dedicated the whole work, dreamed of rebuilding the city of Rome, but he managed to realize only a fragment of his visionary plans. Through his book, Alberti opened up his theories and ideals of the Florentine Renaissance to architects, scholars, and others.

Alberti wrote I Libri della famiglia—which discussed education, marriage, household management, and money—in the Tuscan dialect. The work was not printed until 1843. Like Erasmus decades later, Alberti stressed the need for a reform in education. He noted that "the care of very young children is women's work, for nurses or the mother", and that at the earliest possible age children should be taught the alphabet. With great hopes, he gave the work to his family to read, but in his autobiography Alberti confesses that "he could hardly avoid feeling rage, moreover, when he saw some of his relatives openly ridiculing both the whole work and the author's futile enterprise along it". Momus, written between 1443 and 1450, was a notable comedy about the Olympian deities. It has been considered as a roman à clef—Jupiter has been identified in some sources as Pope Eugenius IV and Pope Nicholas V. Alberti borrowed many of its characters from Lucian, one of his favorite Greek writers. The name of its hero, Momus, refers to the Greek word for blame or criticism. After being expelled from heaven, Momus, the god of mockery, is eventually castrated. Jupiter and the other deities come down to earth also, but they return to heaven after Jupiter breaks his nose in a great storm.

== Architectural works ==
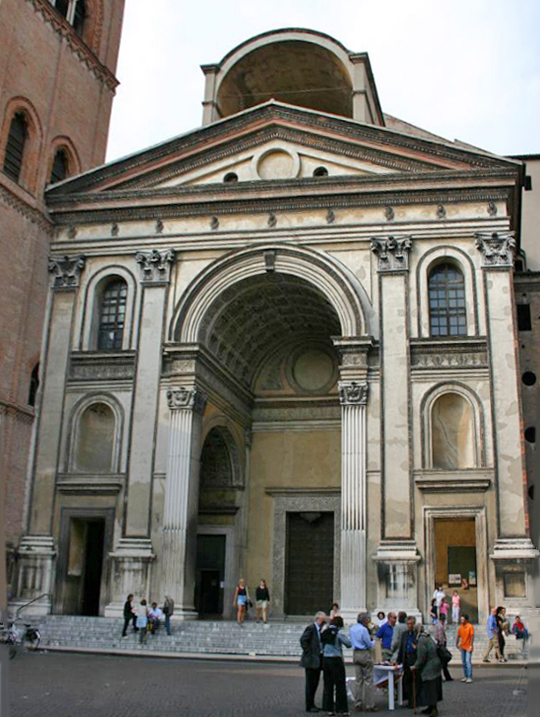
The dramatic façade of Sant' Andrea, Mantua (1471) built to Alberti's design after his death

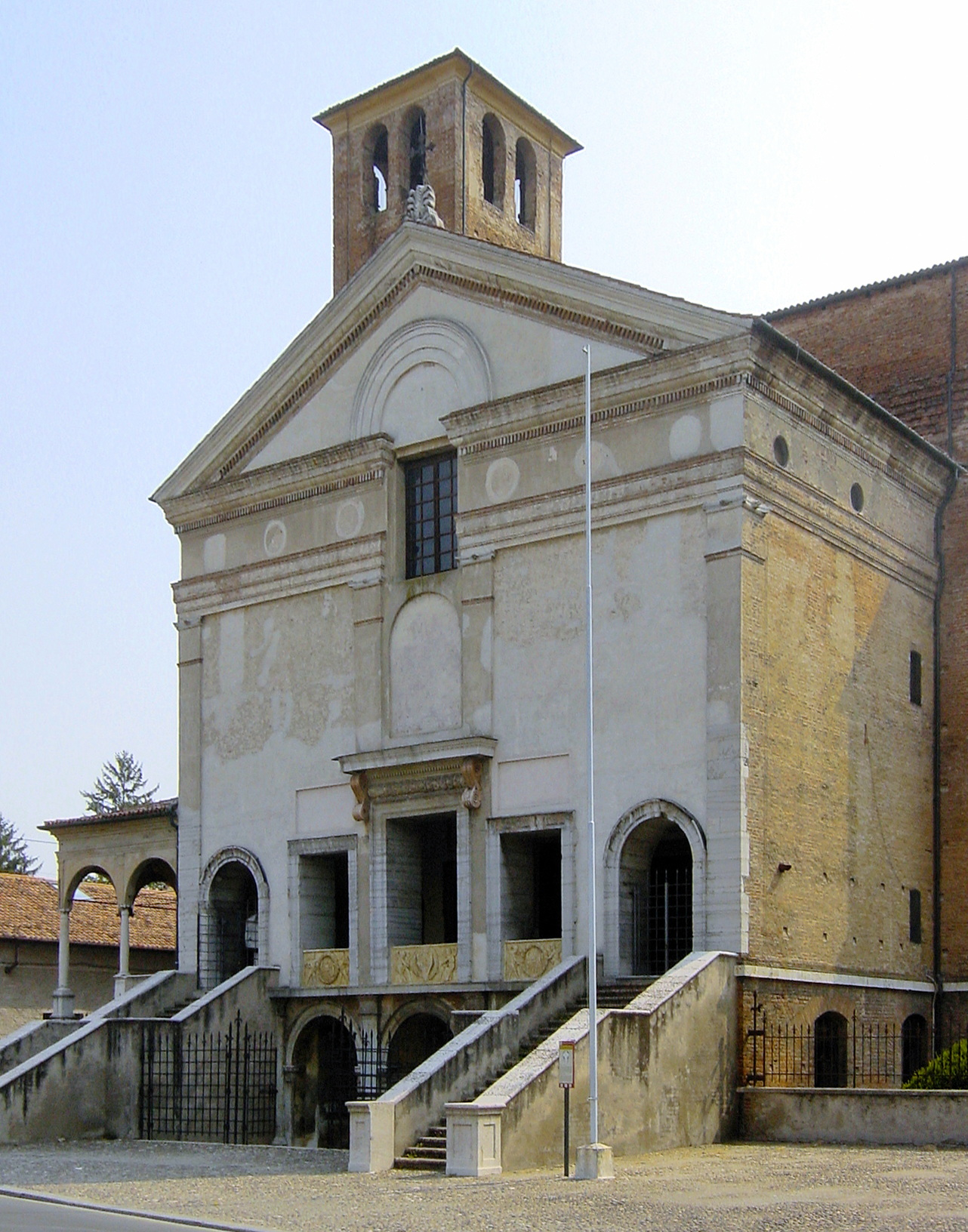
The unfinished and altered façade of San Sebastiano has promoted much speculation as to Alberti's intentions.

Alberti did not concern himself with engineering, and very few of his major projects were built. As a designer and a student of Vitruvius and of ancient Roman architecture, he studied column and lintel based architecture, from a visual rather than structural viewpoint. He correctly employed the Classical orders, unlike his contemporary, Brunelleschi, who used the Classical column and pilaster in a free interpretation. Alberti reflected on the social effects of architecture, and was attentive to the urban landscape. This is demonstrated by his inclusion, at the Rucellai Palace, of a continuous bench for seating at the level of the basement. Alberti anticipated the principle of street hierarchy, with wide main streets connected to secondary streets, and buildings of equal height.

In Rome he was employed by Pope Nicholas V for the restoration of the Roman aqueduct of Acqua Vergine, which debouched into a simple basin designed by Alberti, which was later replaced by the Baroque Trevi Fountain.

Some researchers suggested that the Villa Medici in Fiesole might have been designed by Alberti, rather than by Michelozzo. This hilltop residence commissioned by Giovanni de' Medici, Cosimo il Vecchio's second son, with its view over the city, is sometimes considered the first example of a Renaissance villa: it reflects the writing by Alberti about country residential buildings as "villa suburbana". The building later inspired numerous other similar projects buildings from the end of the fifteenth century.

=== Tempio Malatestiano, Rimini ===
The Tempio Malatestiano in Rimini (1447, 1453–60) is the rebuilding of a Gothic church. The façade, with its dynamic play of forms, was left incomplete.

=== Façade of Palazzo Rucellai ===
The design of the façade of the Palazzo Rucellai (1446–51) was one of several commissioned by the Rucellai family. The design overlays a grid of shallow pilasters and cornices in classical style onto rusticated masonry, and is surmounted by a heavy cornice. The inner courtyard has Corinthian columns. The palace introduced set the use of classical building elements in civic buildings in Florence, and became very influential. The work was executed by Bernardo Rossellino.

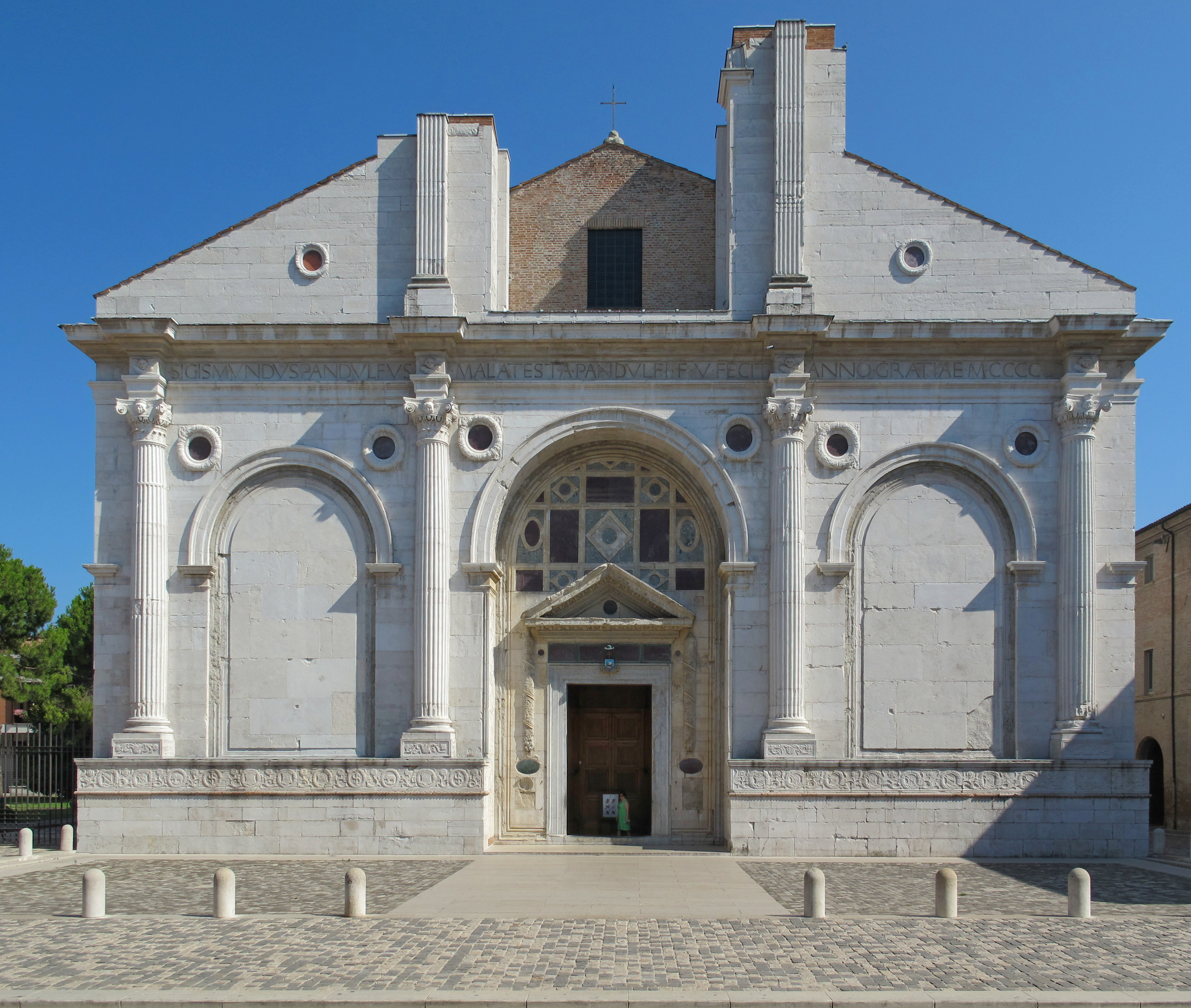
Tempio Malatestiano, Rimini

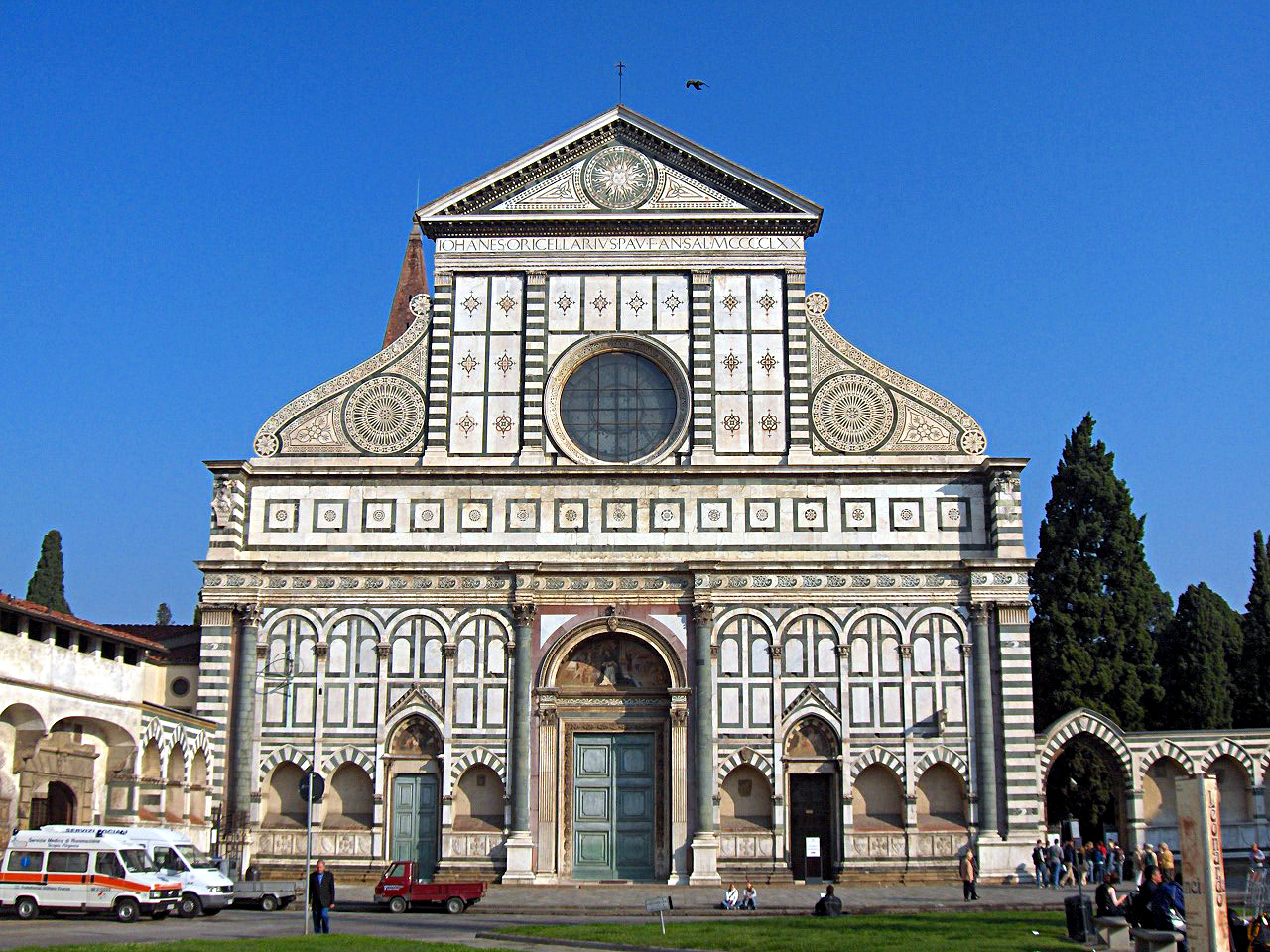
The polychrome façade of Santa Maria Novella

=== Santa Maria Novella ===
At Santa Maria Novella, Florence, between (1448–70) the upper façade was constructed to the design of Alberti. It was a challenging task, as the lower level already had three doorways and six Gothic niches containing tombs and employing the polychrome marble typical of Florentine churches, such as San Miniato al Monte and the Baptistery of Florence. The design also incorporates an ocular window that was already in place. Alberti introduced Classical features around the portico and spread the polychromy over the entire façade in a manner that includes Classical proportions and elements such as pilasters, cornices, and a pediment in the Classical style, ornamented with a sunburst in tesserae, rather than sculpture. The best known feature of this typically aisled church is the manner in which Alberti has solved the problem of visually bridging the different levels of the central nave and much lower side aisles. He employed two large scrolls, which were to become a standard feature of church façades in the later Renaissance, Baroque, and Classical Revival buildings.

=== Pienza ===
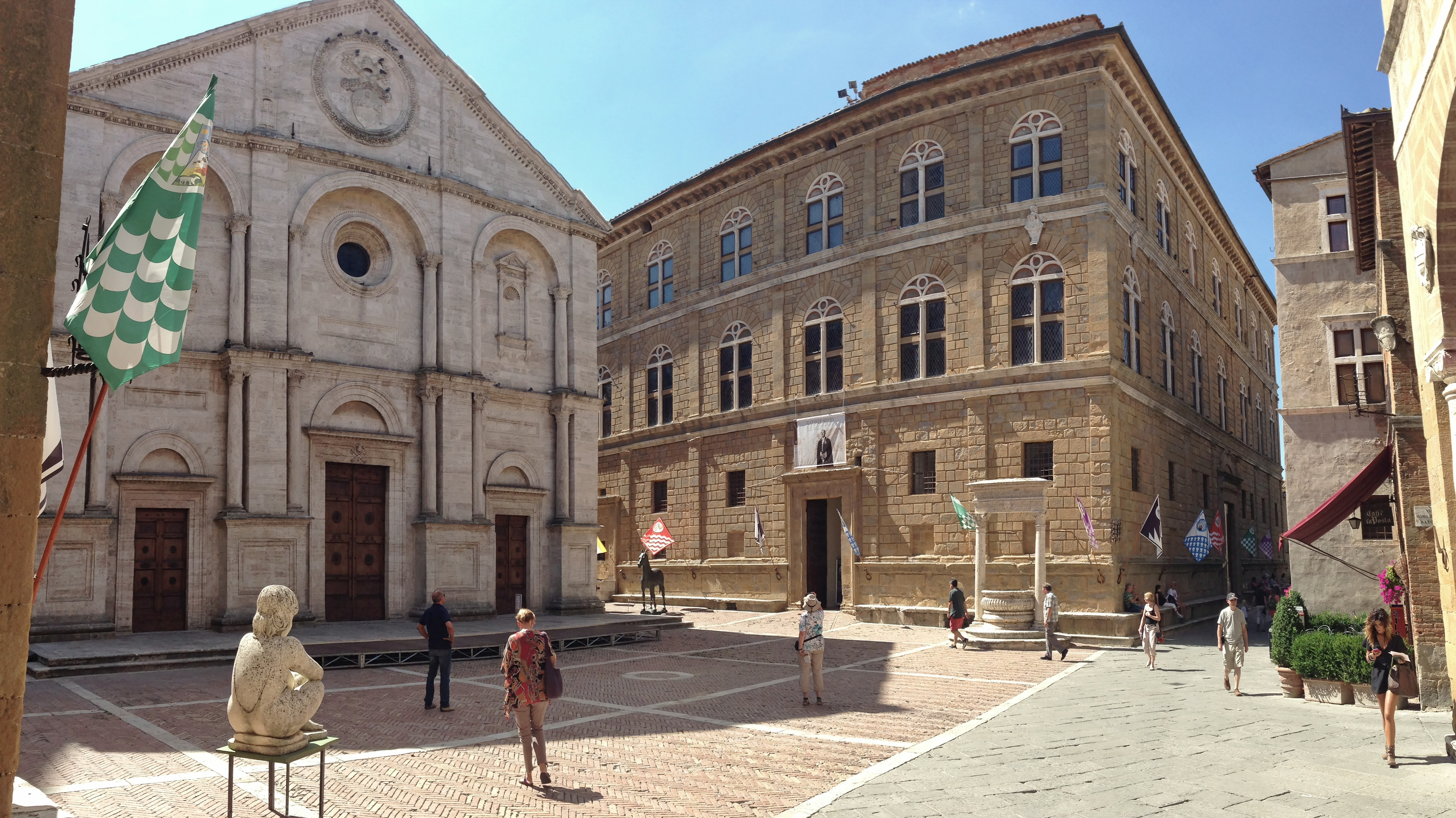
Piazza Pio II in Pienza, looking toward the Palazzo Piccolomini

Alberti is considered to have been the consultant for the design of the Piazza Pio II, Pienza. The village, previously called Corsignano, was redesigned beginning around 1459. It was the birthplace of Aeneas Silvius Piccolomini, Pope Pius II, in whose employ Alberti served. Pius II wanted to use the village as a retreat, but needed for it to reflect the dignity of his position.

The piazza is a trapezoid shape defined by four buildings, with a focus on Pienza Cathedral and passages on either side opening onto a landscape view. The principal residence, Palazzo Piccolomini, is on the western side. It has three stories, articulated by pilasters and entablature courses, with a twin-lighted cross window set within each bay. This structure is similar to Alberti's Palazzo Rucellai in Florence and other later palaces. Noteworthy is the internal court of the palazzo. The back of the palace, to the south, is defined by loggia on all three floors that overlook an enclosed Italian Renaissance garden with Giardino all'italiana era modifications, and spectacular views into the distant landscape of the Val d'Orcia and Pope Pius's beloved Mount Amiata beyond. Below this garden is a vaulted stable that had stalls for a hundred horses. The design, which radically transformed the center of the town, included a palace for the pope, a church, a town hall, and a building for the bishops who would accompany the Pope on his trips. Pienza is considered an early example of Renaissance urban planning.

=== Sant' Andrea, Mantua ===
The Basilica of Sant'Andrea, Mantua was begun in 1471, the year before Alberti's death. It was brought to completion and is his most significant work employing the triumphal arch motif, both for its façade and interior, and influencing many works that were to follow. Alberti perceived the role of architect as designer. Unlike Brunelleschi, he had no interest in the construction, leaving the practicalities to builders and the oversight to others.

=== Other buildings ===
- San Sebastiano, Mantua, (begun 1458) the unfinished façade of which has promoted much speculation as to Alberti's intention
- Sepolcro Rucellai in San Pancrazio, 1467)
- The Tribune for Santissima Annunziata, Florence (1470, completed with alterations, 1477)

== Painting ==
Giorgio Vasari, who argued that historical progress in art reached its peak in Michelangelo, emphasized Alberti's scholarly achievements, not his artistic talents: "He spent his time finding out about the world and studying the proportions of antiquities; but above all, following his natural genius, he concentrated on writing rather than on applied work." In On Painting, Alberti uses the expression "We Painters", but as a painter, or sculptor, he was a dilettante. "In painting Alberti achieved nothing of any great importance or beauty", wrote Vasari. "The very few paintings of his that are extant are far from perfect, but this is not surprising since he devoted himself more to his studies than to draughtsmanship." Jacob Burckhardt portrayed Alberti in The Civilization of the Renaissance in Italy as a truly universal genius. "And Leonardo Da Vinci was to Alberti as the finisher to the beginner, as the master to the dilettante. Would only that Vasari's work were here supplemented by a description like that of Alberti! The colossal outlines of Leonardo's nature can never be more than dimly and distantly conceived."

Alberti is said to appear in Mantegna's great frescoes in the Camera degli Sposi, as the older man dressed in dark red clothes, who whispers in the ear of Ludovico Gonzaga, the ruler of Mantua. In Alberti's self-portrait, a large plaquette, he is clothed as a Roman. To the left of his profile is a winged eye. On the reverse side is the question, Quid tum? (what then), taken from Virgil's Eclogues: "So what, if Amyntas is dark? (quid tum si fuscus Amyntas?) Violets are black, and hyacinths are black."

== Contributions and cultural influence ==
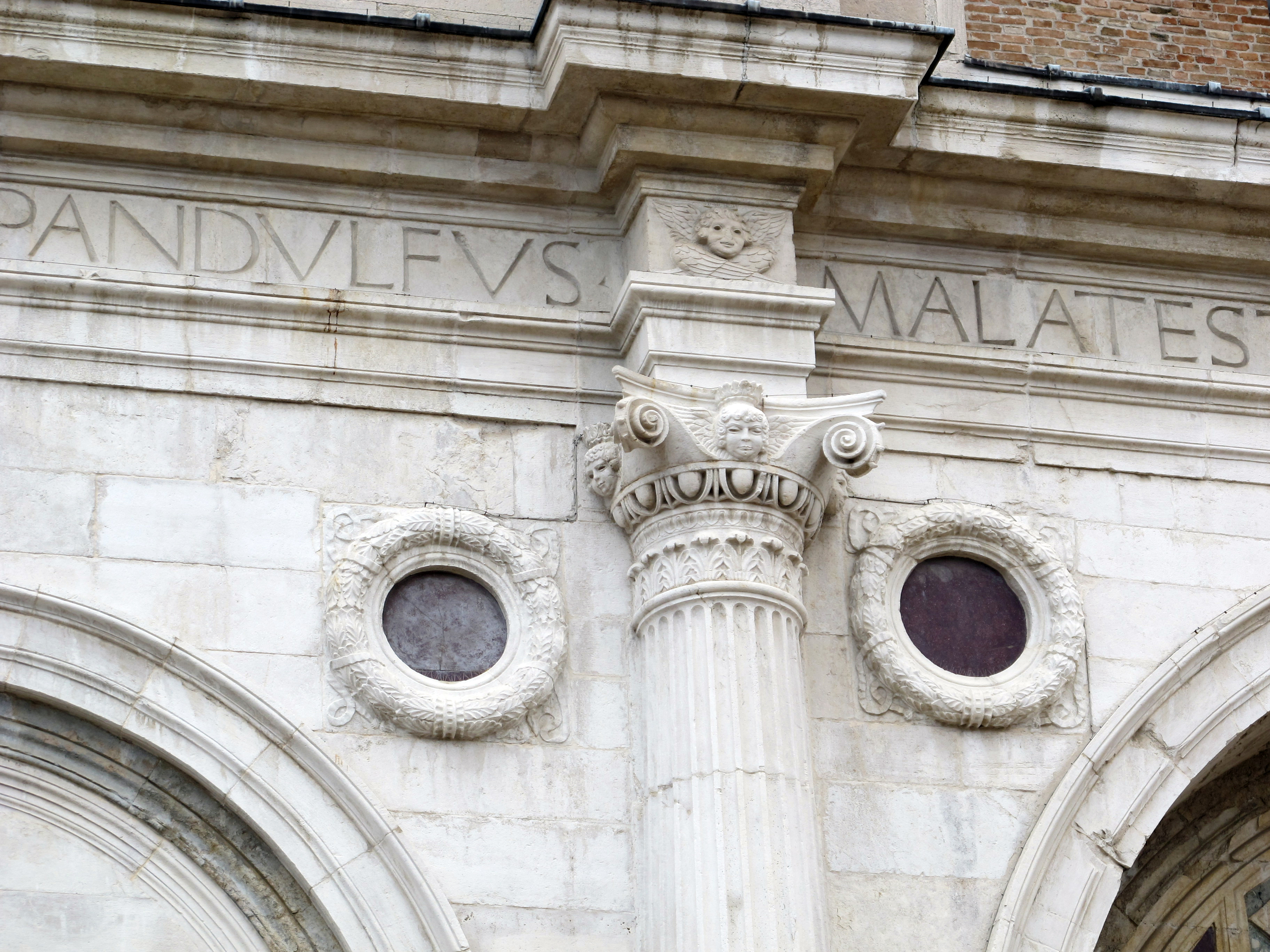
Detail of the façade of Tempio Malatestiano

Alberti made a variety of contributions to several fields:

- Alberti was the creator of a theory called "historia". In his treatise De pictura (1435) he explains the theory of the accumulation of people, animals, and buildings, which create harmony amongst each other, and "hold the eye of the learned and unlearned spectator for a long while with a certain sense of pleasure and emotion". De pictura ("On Painting") contained the first scientific study of perspective. An Italian translation of De pictura (Della pittura) was published in 1436, one year after the original Latin version and addressed Filippo Brunelleschi in the preface. The Latin version had been dedicated to Alberti's humanist patron, Gianfrancesco Gonzaga of Mantua. He also wrote works on sculpture, De statua.
- Alberti used his artistic treatises to propound a new humanistic theory of art. He drew on his contacts with early Quattrocento artists such as Brunelleschi, Donatello, and Ghiberti to provide a practical handbook for the renaissance artist.
- Alberti developed the concept of the Albertian Window, explained in his book De Pictura, a foundational concept in the development of linear perspective, which is in use today in fields from architecture to computer graphics. Also, the multiple-perspective methods of modern art of Cubism might be in debt to Alberti, as well as the advance in physics in delineating what is known now as an 'inertial frame of reference' and relative motion problems solved by Albert Einstein. These advances in the state of the art, using the same methods of observation--window, frame of reference-- are only speculatively associated at this time.
- Alberti wrote an influential work on architecture, De re aedificatoria, which by the sixteenth century had been translated into Italian (by Cosimo Bartoli), French, Spanish, and English. An English translation was by Giacomo Leoni in the early eighteenth century. Newer translations are now available.
- Whilst Alberti's treatises on painting and architecture have been hailed as the founding texts of a new form of art, breaking from the Gothic past, it is impossible to know the extent of their practical impact during his lifetime. His praise of the Calumny of Apelles led to several attempts to emulate it, including paintings by Botticelli and Signorelli. His stylistic ideals have been put into practice in the works of Mantegna, Piero della Francesca, and Fra Angelico. But how far Alberti was responsible for these innovations and how far he was simply articulating the trends of the artistic movement, with which his practical experience had made him familiar, is impossible to ascertain.
- He was so a skilled composer of Latin verse: a comedy he wrote when twenty years old, entitled Philodoxius, would later deceive the younger Aldus Manutius, who edited and published it as the genuine work of 'Lepidus Comicus'.

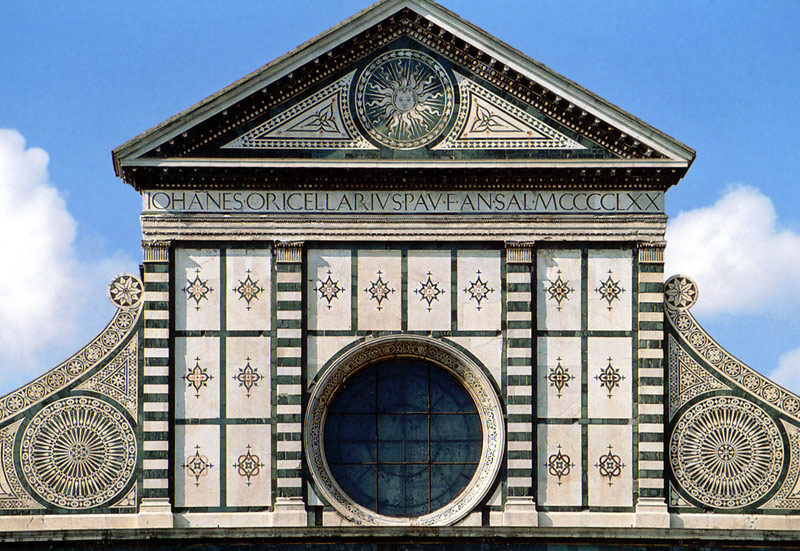
The upper storey of Santa Maria Novella

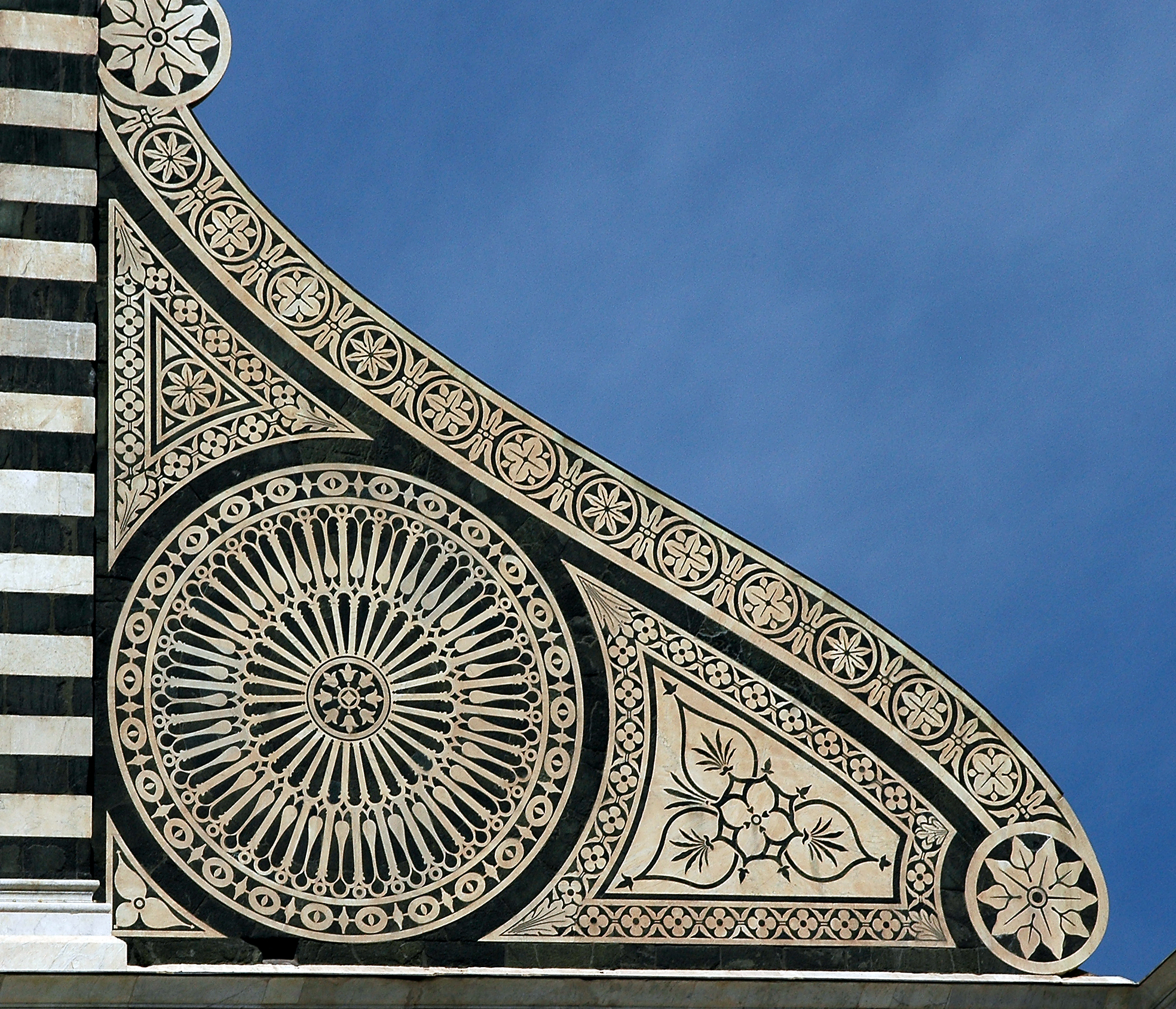
One of the giant scrolls at Santa Maria Novella

- He has been credited with being the author, or alternatively, the designer of the woodcut illustrations, of the Hypnerotomachia Poliphili, a strange fantasy novel.
- Apart from his treatises on the arts, Alberti also wrote: Philodoxus ("Lover of Glory", 1424), De commodis litterarum atque incommodis ("On the Advantages and Disadvantages of Literary Studies", 1429), Intercoenales ("Table Talk", c. 1429), Della famiglia ("On the Family", begun 1432), Vita S. Potiti ("Life of St. Potitus", 1433), De iure (On Law, 1437), Theogenius ("The Origin of the Gods", c. 1440), Profugorium ab aerumna ("Refuge from Mental Anguish",), Momus (1450), and De Iciarchia ("On the Prince", 1468). These and other works were translated and printed in Venice by the humanist Cosimo Bartoli in 1586.
- Alberti was an accomplished cryptographer by the standard of his day and invented the first polyalphabetic cipher, which is now known as the Alberti cipher, and machine-assisted encryption using his Cipher Disk. The polyalphabetic cipher was, at least in principle (for it was not properly used for several hundred years) the most significant advance in cryptography since classical times. Cryptography historian David Kahn called him the "Father of Western Cryptography", pointing to three significant advances in the field that can be attributed to Alberti: "the earliest Western exposition of cryptanalysis, the invention of polyalphabetic substitution, and the invention of enciphered code". The first known recorded explanation of cryptanalysis was given six centuries prior by Al-Kindi, a 9th-century Arab polymath.
- According to Alberti, in a short autobiography written c. 1438 in Latin and in the third person, (many but not all scholars consider this work to be an autobiography) he was capable of "standing with his feet together, and springing over a man's head." The autobiography survives thanks to an eighteenth-century transcription by Antonio Muratori. Alberti also claimed that he "excelled in all bodily exercises; could, with feet tied, leap over a standing man; could in the great cathedral, throw a coin far up to ring against the vault; amused himself by taming wild horses and climbing mountains". Needless to say, many in the Renaissance promoted themselves in various ways and Alberti's eagerness to promote his skills should be understood, to some extent, within that framework.
- Alberti claimed in his "autobiography" to be an accomplished musician and organist, but there is no hard evidence to support this claim. In fact, musical posers were not uncommon in his day (see the lyrics to the song Musica Son, by Francesco Landini, for complaints to this effect.) He held the appointment of canon in the metropolitan church of Florence, and thus – perhaps – had the leisure to devote himself to this art, but this is only speculation. Vasari also agreed with this.
- He was interested in the drawing of maps and worked with the astronomer, astrologer, and cartographer Paolo Toscanelli.
- In the domain of Aesthetics Alberti is recognized for his definition of art as imitation of nature, exactly as a selection of its most beautiful parts: "So let's take from nature what we are going to paint, and from nature we choose the most beautiful and worthy things".
- Borsi states that Alberti's writings on architecture continue to influence modern and contemporary architecture stating: "The organicism and nature-worship of Wright, the neat classicism of van der Mies, the regulatory outlines and anthropomorphic, harmonic, modular systems of Le Corbusier, and Kahn's revival of the 'antique' are all elements that tempt one to trace Alberti's influence on modern architecture."

== Works in print ==
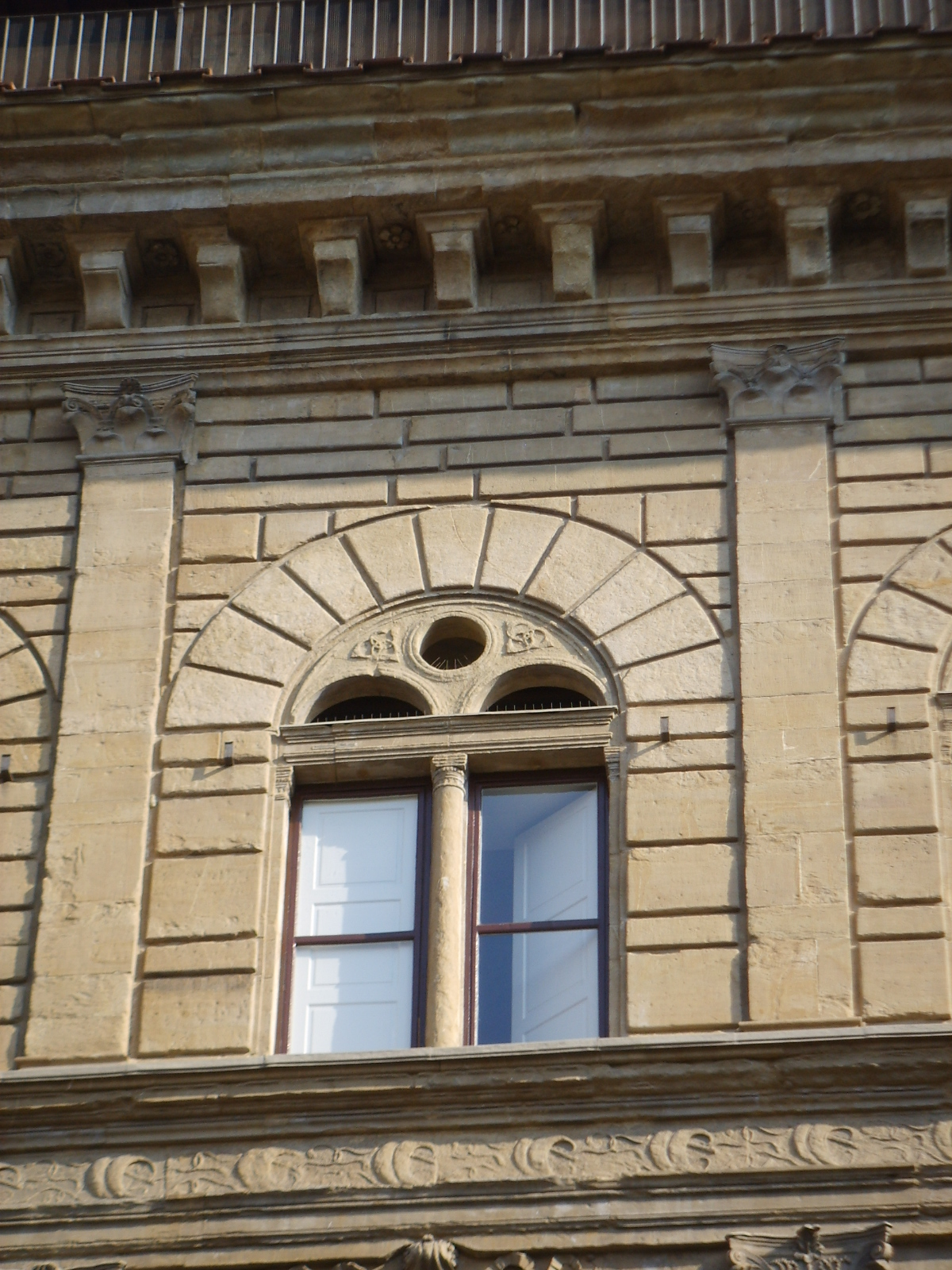
A window of the Rucellai Palace

- De Pictura, 1435. On Painting, in English, De Pictura, in Latin, On Painting. Penguin Classics. 1972. ISBN 978-0-14-043331-9.; Della Pittura, in Italian (1804 [1434]).
- Momus, Latin text and English translation, 2003 ISBN 0-674-00754-9
- De re aedificatoria (1452, Ten Books on Architecture). Alberti, Leon Battista. De re aedificatoria. On the art of building in ten books. (translated by Joseph Rykwert, Robert Tavernor and Neil Leach). Cambridge, Mass.: MIT Press, 1988. ISBN 0-262-51060-X. ISBN 978-0-262-51060-8. Latin, French and Italian editions and in English translation.
- De Cifris A Treatise on Ciphers (1467), trans. A. Zaccagnini. Foreword by David Kahn, Galimberti, Torino 1997.
- Della tranquillitá dell'animo. 1441.
- "Leon Battista Alberti. On Painting. A New Translation and Critical Edition", Edited and Translated by Rocco Sinisgalli, Cambridge University Press, New York, May 2011, ISBN 978-1-107-00062-9, (books.google.de)
- I libri della famiglia, Italian edition
- "Dinner pieces". A Translation of the Intercenales by David Marsh. Center for Medieval and Early Renaissance Studies, State University of New York, Binghamton 1987.
- "Descriptio urbis Romae. Leon Battista Alberti's Delineation of the city of Rome". Peter Hicks, Arizona Board of Regents for Arizona State university 2007.
- (LA) Leon Battista Alberti, De re aedificatoria, Argentorati, excudebat M. Iacobus Cammerlander Moguntinus, 1541.
- (LA) Leon Battista Alberti, De re aedificatoria, Florentiae, accuratissime impressum opera magistri Nicolai Laurentii Alamani.
- Leon Battista Alberti, Opere volgari. 1, Firenze, Tipografia Galileiana, 1843.
- Leon Battista Alberti, Opere volgari. 2, Firenze, Tipografia Galileiana, 1844.
- Leon Battista Alberti, Opere volgari. 4, Firenze, Tipografia Galileiana, 1847.
- Leon Battista Alberti, Opere volgari. 5, Firenze, Tipografia Galileiana, 1849.
- Leon Battista Alberti, Opere, Florentiae, J. C. Sansoni, 1890.
- Leon Battista Alberti, Trattati d'arte, Bari, Laterza, 1973.
- Leon Battista Alberti, Ippolito e Leonora, Firenze, Bartolomeo de' Libri, prima del 1495.
- Leon Battista Alberti, Ecatonfilea, Stampata in Venesia, per Bernardino da Cremona, 1491.
- Leon Battista Alberti, Deifira, Padova, Lorenzo Canozio, 1471.
- Leon Battista Alberti, Teogenio, Milano, Leonard Pachel, circa 1492.
- Leon Battista Alberti, Libri della famiglia, Bari, G. Laterza, 1960.
- Leon Battista Alberti, Rime e trattati morali, Bari, Laterza, 1966.
- Franco Borsi, Leon Battista Alberti: Opera completa, Electa, Milano, 1973;

== In popular culture ==
- Leon Battista Alberti is a major character in Roberto Rossellini's three-part television film The Age of the Medici (1973), with the third and final part, Leon Battista Alberti: Humanism, centering on him, his works (such as Santa Maria Novella), and his thought. He is played by Italian actor Virginio Gazzolo.
- Mentioned in the 1994 film Renaissance Man or Army Intelligence starring Danny DeVito.
- Mentioned in the 2004 book The Rule of Four by Ian Caldwell and Dustin Thomason
- Mentioned in the board game Alma mater in cards with special powers.
- Dr Peter Weller, an actor renowned for his role in the 1987 film RoboCop and appearing in over seventy films and television shows, authored Leon Battista Alberti in Exile: Tracing the Path to the First Modern Book on Painting, in this work published by Cambridge University Press on March 6th, 2025. Weller argues that Leon Battista Alberti’s seminal treatise De pictura was profoundly shaped by his experiences in exile in cities such as Padua, Bologna, and Rome, rather than solely by his later return to Florence. Weller contends that Alberti’s humanist education, mathematical training, and exposure to diverse artistic traditions in these cities provided the intellectual and visual foundation for his groundbreaking integration of humanism and art theory, which elevated painting to the status of a liberal art.
