= Cosimo Bartoli =

Italian diplomat, mathematician, philologist, and humanist

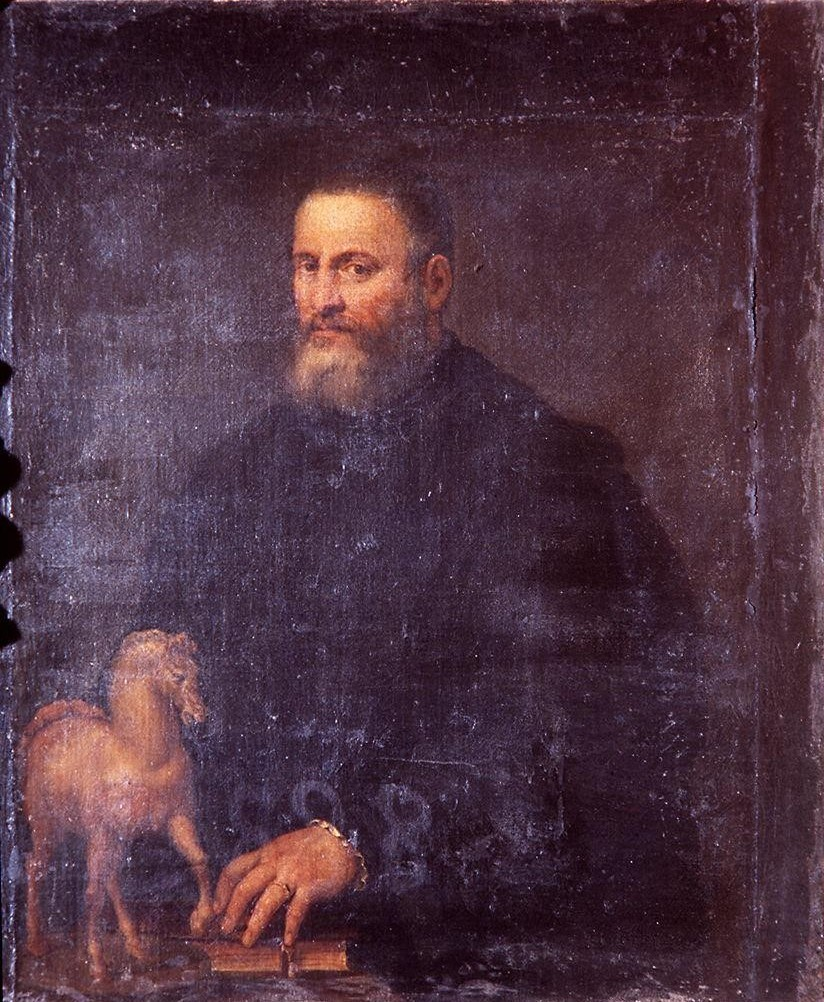
Portrait of Bartoli by the school of Titian, first half of the 16th century

Cosimo Bartoli (December 20, 1503 in Florence – October 25, 1572) was an Italian diplomat, mathematician, philologist, and humanist. He worked and lived in Rome and Florence and took minor orders. He was a friend of architect and writer Giorgio Vasari, and helped him to get his Vite ready for publication.

== Life ==
Bartoli worked in diplomatic circles, including as secretary to Cardinal Giovanni de’ Medici and as diplomatic agent for Duke Cosimo I. Bartoli wrote Ragionamenti accademici (Venice, 1567), which was mainly a criticism of Dante. One chapter, however, gave descriptions of composers and instrumentalists. He cited the composers Johannes Ockeghem and Josquin des Prez as equal to Donatello and Michelangelo in their respective arts, and stated that Ockeghem and Donatello were the precursors to Josquin and Michelangelo. In this book he also critiques architecture and painting, mainly focusing on the arts of his native Florence. He extolled the concept of invenzione in all the arts.

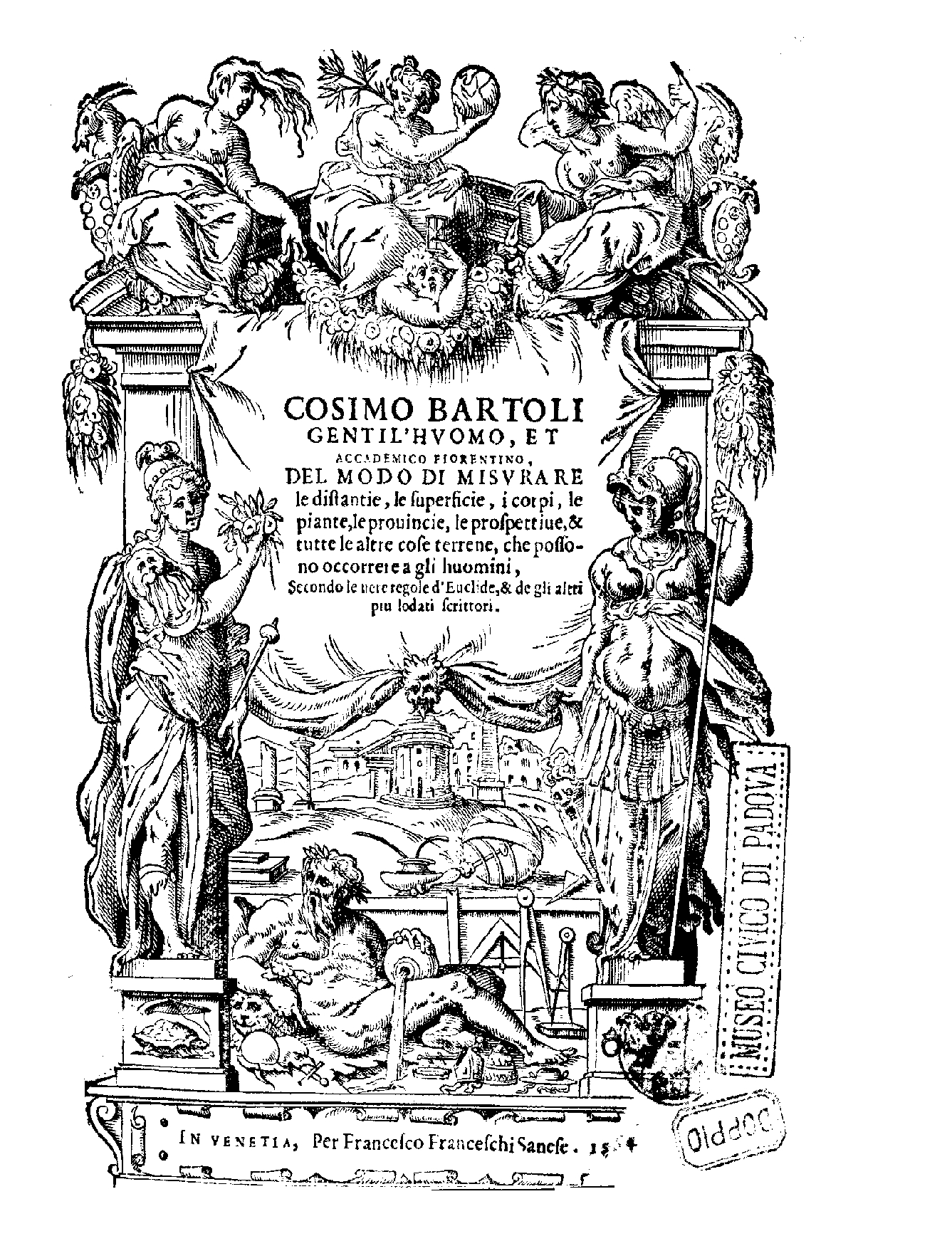
Le piante, le provincie, le prospettive, e tutte le altre cose terrene, 1564

== Works ==
- Del modo di misurare le distantie, le superficie, i corpi, le piante, le provincie, le prospettive, e tutte le altre cose terrene, che possono occorrere a gli huomini, secondo le vere regole d'Euclide, e de gli altri più lodati scrittori (in Italian). Venezia: Francesco De Franceschi (senese). 1564.

He also published a collection of translations of works by Leon Battista Alberti under the title Opuscoli Morali di Leon Batista Alberti, gentil’huomo firentino. Venice, 1568. These included:

- Momo, ovvero del Principe
- De’ discorsi de senatori, altrimenti Trivia
- Dell’amministrare la regione
- Delle commodità e delle incommodità delle lettere
- Della vita di S. Potito
- La cifra
- Le piacevolezze matematiche
- Della repubblica
- Della statua
- Della mosca
- Del cane
- Cento apologi
- Hecatomphila
- Deiphira

== Bibliography ==
- Clement A. Miller. "Cosimo Bartoli", Grove Music Online, ed. L. Macy (accessed March 18, 2006), grovemusic.com (subscription access).
