= Parri Spinelli =

Italian painter

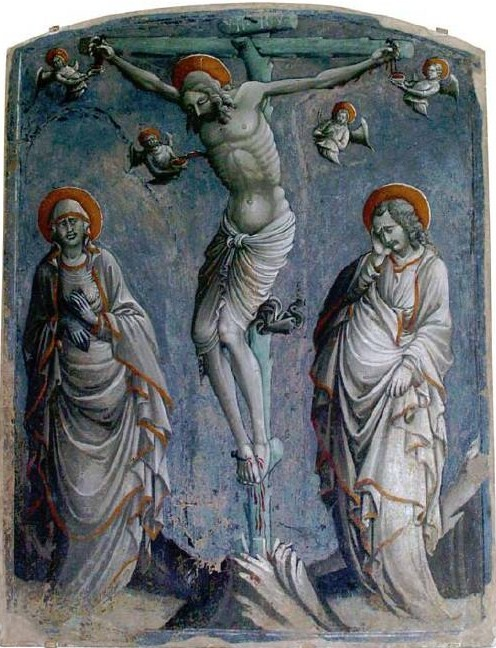
Christ on the Cross With the Virgin and Saint John by Parri Spinelli, 1445

Parri Spinelli (c. 1387 – 1453) was an Italian (Tuscan) painter of the early renaissance who was born in the Province of Arezzo. His father and teacher was Spinello Aretino (1350–1410), who was active throughout Tuscany. Parri Spinelli lived in Florence from 1411 or 1412 to 1419, and was a member of the workshop of Lorenzo Ghiberti. He became the most important painter in Arezzo upon his return. Spinelli died in 1453 in Arezzo Province. His paintings are notable for their bold colors and figures that are more elongated than those of his predecessors.
