= De re aedificatoria =

Classic architectural treatise

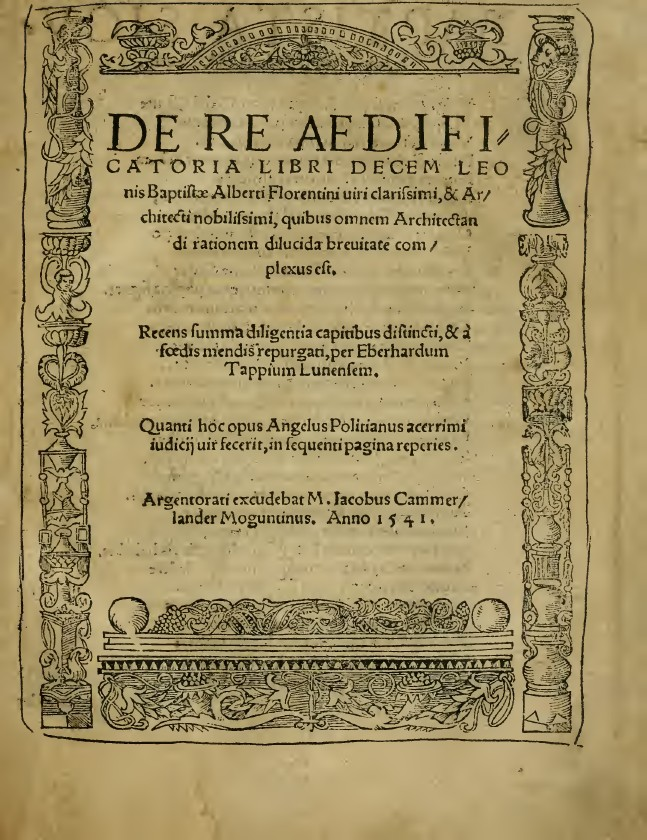
De re aedificatoria, title page of the 1541 edition

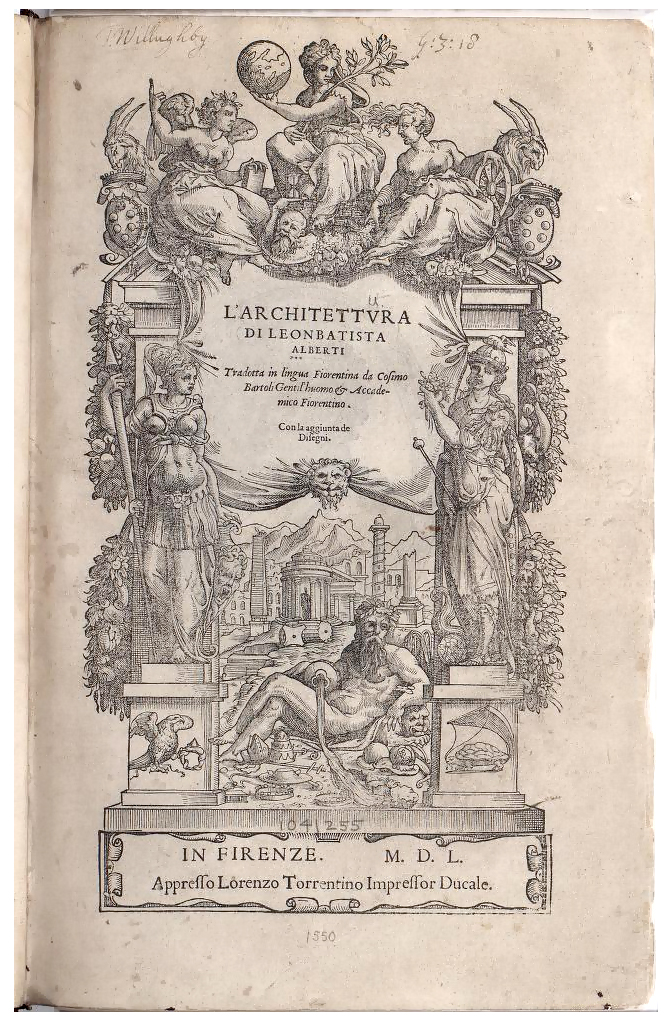
Title page of 1550 edition, Florence

De re aedificatoria (On the Art of Building) is a classic architectural treatise written by Leon Battista Alberti between 1443 and 1452. Although largely dependent on Vitruvius's De architectura, it was the first theoretical book on the subject written in the Italian Renaissance, and in 1485 it became the first printed book on architecture. It was followed in 1486 with the first printed edition of Vitruvius.

== Book ==
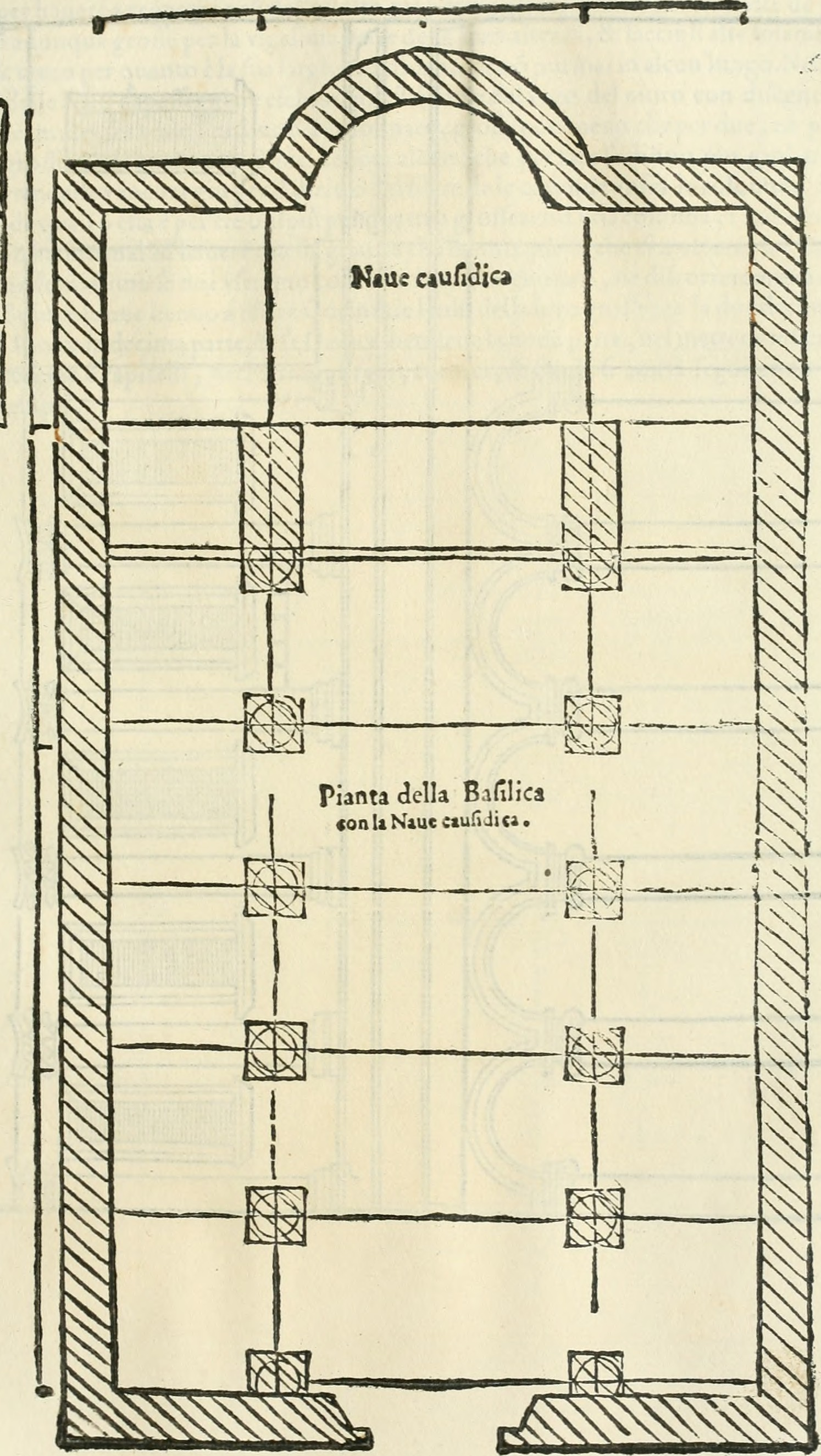
Plate from a 1565 edition, showing the plan of a basilica

Alberti's Ten Books consciously echoes Vitruvius's writing, but Alberti also adopts a critical attitude toward his predecessor. In his discussion, Alberti includes a wide variety of literary sources, including Plato and Aristotle, presenting a concise version of the sociology of architecture. De re aedificatoria is subdivided into ten books and includes:

- Book One: Lineaments
- Book Two: Materials
- Book Three: Construction
- Book Four: Public Works
- Book Five: Works of Individuals
- Book Six: Ornament
- Book Seven: Ornament to Sacred Buildings
- Book Eight: Ornament to Public Secular Buildings
- Book Nine: Ornament to Private Buildings
- Book Ten: Restoration of Buildings

In his survey of desirable floor plans for sacred buildings – "temples" in his phrase—Alberti begins with the ideal form of the circle, which is expressed in numerous examples of Nature. Nine ideal centrally– planned geometrical shapes are recommended for churches; besides the circle he lists the square, the hexagon, octagon, decagon, and dodecagon, all derived from the circle, and, derived from the square, rectangles that exhibit the square and a half, square and a third and double square, all of which have enharmonic parallels in music. Chapels add small geometric figures to the basic circles and polygons to give a great variety of floor plans, in which each geometrical figure retains its clear unity and simple ratios that bind all elements of the plans and elevations into a harmonic unity.

De re aedificatoria remained the classic treatise on architecture from the 16th until the 18th century.

== Book Nine ==
In Book Nine, Alberti presents his comments about aesthetic theory and beauty which Borsi summarizes on page 234 of his Alberti book stating: "In short, what are the elements that constitute beauty? (Or what elements derive from each particular kind of beauty?) The question is a difficult one." Quoting Alberti, Borsi presents Alberti as stating:

"For whatever that property be which is chosen from the whole number and nature of the several parts or attributed to each of them in precise and equal measure, or which must be such as to form a single entity of organism out of a number of parts, binding them together in a just, stable and harmonious manner... it must certainly contain within itself the value, I would almost say the essence of all the above-mentioned parts with which it is connected or which it compenetrates. Otherwise they would clash and the beauty of the whole be lost. This enquiry and selection is in itself far from easy or obvious. But it is particularly hazardous and difficult in the field we have chosen to enquire into, for architecture consists of so many various parts, and each of these parts requires so many different ornaments, as we have already seen."

For Borsi, Alberti is deriving his viewpoint from the Enneads by Plotinus.

== See also ==
- De pictura
- De architectura
- I quattro libri dell'architettura
- firmitas, utilitas et venustas
