= Rocco Sinisgalli =

Rocco Sinisgalli (born 1947) is an Italian art historian, writer and architectural theoretician.

== Early life ==
Sinisgalli was born in Gallicchio, in the province of Potenza and was educated in an Italian classical Liceo. He received a degree for Architecture in 1973 in the University of Rome La Sapienza. He currently teaches and carries out his research at the Faculty of Architecture Valle Giulia in the University of Rome La Sapienza.

== Career and Works ==
Sinisgalli has been a national coordinator of research throughout the Universities in Rome such as Trieste and Genoa. He also has been the director of a bilateral research program with France (Centre National de la Recherche Scientifique-Paris —Consiglio Nazionale delle Ricerche-Rome). As the scientist responsible for the Italian party, he organized the International Symposium in France on “'Desargues et son temps' (Paris - Lyon, 25–30 November 1991), where he was a member of the Paris committee for the examinations of the 'Doctorat dans l’Histoire de la Perspective.' Rocco Sinisgalli is a historian with a perspective view for arts, science and techniques. Appointed as a Raffaello Sanzio Academician in Urbino, he established the “International Center of Studies: Urbino e la Prospettiv in the same city. He is well known for works related to Ptolemy, Jordanus, Commandino, Guidobaldo Del Monte, Stevin, Borromini, Maurolico, Leonardo and Alberti; which aim to a better historical view for geometry and representation in art and architecture.

In 1986, Sinisgalli was responsible for the “Sezione Spazio” at the “Art and Science” Biennale in Venice. In 1990, he established «I lunedì della Prospettiva», a series of lecture on History of Perspective at the Swiss Institute in Rome. As a lecturer at the national and international symposia, he gave lectures in Italy and abroad, and received prizes and merits for his works.

=== Fellowship ===
- 1975: Paris, Centre Alexandre Koyré
- 1984: Paris, Centre Alexandre Koyré
- 1988: Washington D.C., National Gallery of Art (CASVA)
- 1988: Los Angeles, Getty Center (guest scholar)
- 1991: Los Angeles, Getty Center (guest scholar)
- 1992: Washington D.C., National Gallery of Art (CASVA)
- 2006: Williamstown (Massachusetts), Clark Art Institute
- 2007: Brussels, Royal Flemish Academy of Belgium for Science and the Arts (VLAC)

=== Honors ===
- 2003: Raffaello Sanzio Academician (Urbino)
- 2005: Honorary President - International Center of Studies “Urbino e la Prospettiva”
- 2007: President - National Center of Studies “Ut Pictura Poesis” (Quintus Horatius Flaccus)

== Publications ==
Sinisgalli published twenty-three books. The following are in English:

1. A history of the perspective scene from the Renaissance to the Baroque (Florence 2000)
2. A voyage into baroque spectacle. The Gallery in the Palazzo Spada (Rome 2001)
3. The New De Pictura of Leon Battista Alberti (Rome 2006)
4. The Vitruvian Man of Leonardo (Florence, 2006)
5. Leonardo and the Divine Proportion (Florence, 2007)
6. Leon Battista Alberti. On painting. A New Translation and Critical Edition, New York 2011, Cambridge University Press
7. Perspective in the Visual Culture of Classical Antiquity, New York 2012, Cambridge University Press
