= Vitis International Variety Catalogue =

Public grapevine variety database

The Vitis International Variety Catalogue (VIVC) is a database of various species and varieties/cultivars of grapevine, the genus Vitis. VIVC is administered by the Geilweilerhof Institute for Grape Breeding (Institut für Rebenzüchtung Geilweilerhof) in Siebeldingen, Germany, and contains information from grapevine collections existing in various institutes of viticulture around the world. As of May 2026, the information in the database brought together information from 130 institutions located in 45 countries, and contains over 23,000 entries.

The database was started in 1983, and has been available online since 1996. Its initial creation was supported by the International Organisation of Vine and Wine and the International Board for Plant Genetic Resources, a forerunner of Bioversity International. The purpose of the VIVC database is to provide documentation on available grapevine genetic resources, and to be a source of information to grape breeders, viticultural researchers and others.

The information on grape cultivars in VIVC includes basic characteristics of the cultivars, holding institutes, passport data, and all known synonyms, which are quite numerous for many grape cultivars. In some cases, photos and genetic information (microsatellite information used for DNA profiling) are included.
