= National Public Gardens Day =

- Observed by: North America
- Type: Cultural
- Significance: Celebrate and Recognize Botanic Gardens, Arboreta, and Public Gardens
- Celebrations: Over 600 member gardens throughout North America
- Date: Friday before Mother's Day (second Sunday in May)
- 2024 date: May 10
- 2025 date: May 9
- 2026 date: May 8
- 2027 date: May 7
- Frequency: annual

National Public Gardens Day, occurring annually on the Friday before Mother's Day, is a day to promote awareness of botanic gardens, arboreta, zoos, historic gardens, or any of North America's public gardens. The day was established by the American Public Gardens Association, a Pennsylvania non-profit organization that supports, resources and promotes public gardens in North America.

== Activities ==
Members of the American Public Gardens Association celebrated National Public Gardens Day beginning in 2009 with activities that varied by garden. The Atlanta Botanical Garden invited visitors to bring flowers so that they could be put into arrangements for patients and their families at Children's Hospital The Desert Botanical Garden in Phoenix, Arizona, asked visitors to pledge to conserve water, displaying 400 five-gallon water containers that pledgers could adopt. National spokesperson Paul James visited media gardens, speaking with the public and media about the role public gardens play in the local community.

In 2010, Senator Dick Durbin of Illinois spoke on the floor of the U.S. Senate about the importance of recognizing National Public Gardens Day, listing the US Botanic Garden and gardens in Illinois as examples.

== History ==
Created in 2009, in partnership with sponsor, Rain Bird, as a way to increase public awareness of the educational resources public gardens provide to local communities, National Public Gardens Day was adopted by the members of the American Public Gardens Association, to highlight programs such as plant conservation, water conservation, the preservation of green spaces, and home gardening.

The national spokesperson for National Public Gardens Day was Paul James, host of HGTV's Gardening By The Yard.

== Recognition ==
National Public Gardens Day has been recognized by various levels of government:

- The City of Philadelphia, Pennsylvania
- The City of Dallas, Texas
- The City of Belmont, North Carolina
- The State of Delaware
- The Town of Framingham, Massachusetts
- The State of California, State Assembly
- The State of California, Governor's Office
- The State of Florida
- The United States Congress
