= Sarah Reichard =

Botanist

- Born: December 16, 1957
- Died: August 29, 2016 (aged 58); South Africa
- Education: University of Washington
- Spouse: Brian Reichard
- Scientific career
- Fields: Botany
- Workplaces: University of Washington

Sarah Reichard (December 16 1957 - August 29, 2016) was a botanist and tenured full professor who held an endowed chair at the University of Washington's School of Environmental and Forest Sciences in the College of the Environment. Reichard was also the first permanent woman director of the University of Washington Botanic Gardens, overseeing the Washington Park Arboretum and Center for Urban Horticulture. Her research focussed on plant conservation, including rare and invasive species. She published more than 50 studies in peer-reviewed journals and two books. Reichard has been described as "a trailblazing scholar in a time when few women rose to the top levels of horticultural professions."

== Early life ==
Sarah Elizabeth Hayden was born in North Carolina and grew up in New Orleans, Louisiana. Her father was an "avid gardener," and her mother was a plant geneticist.

== Education ==
Reichard completed her B.S. in Botany and her M.S. and Ph.D. in Forest Resources at the University of Washington in Seattle.

== Career ==
Reichard co-authored and published more than 50 studies in peer-reviewed journals and wrote The Conscientious Gardener: Cultivating a Garden Ethic, described as a "modest and unassuming but powerful book." She also co-authored a report for the National Research Council, “Predicting Invasions of Nonindigenous Plants and Plant Pests", and co-edited the seminal work Invasive Species in the Pacific Northwest. In addition to her work as a researcher, Reichard taught a range of undergraduate and graduate courses at the University of Washington, including study abroad courses in Cuba and South Africa. She was the vice president of the Pacific Northwest Invasive Plant Council and served for six years on the Federal Invasive Species Advisory Committee and the Invasive Species Specialist Group of the International Union for Conservation of Nature.

== Death ==
Reichard led horticulture trips around the world. While on such a trip in Cape Town, South Africa, she unexpectedly died in her sleep from a brain aneurysm on August 29, 2016. She was 58 years old.

== Recognition ==
In 2006, Reichard won the American Public Gardens Association's Professional Citation Award.

== Bibliography ==
=== Books ===
- Reichard, Sarah Hayden (2001). The Conscientious Gardener: Cultivating a Garden Ethic. Berkeley, California: University of California Press. ISBN 0520267400.

=== Journal articles ===
- Reichard, Sarah Hayden; White, Peter (February 2001). "Horticulture as a Pathway of Invasive Plant Introductions in the United States: Most invasive plants have been introduced for horticultural use by nurseries, botanical gardens, and individuals". BioScience. 51 (2): 103–113. doi:10.1641/0006-3568(2001)051[0103:HAAPOI]2.0.CO;2.
