= Jan Gaykema Jacobsz. =

Dutch painter

Jan Gaykema Jacobsz. (11 March 1798 – 16 July 1875) was a Dutch painter, draughtsman and botanical illustrator.

== Birth ==
Jan Gaykema Jacobsz. was born at the Wagenweg, in a part of the village of Heemstede that would be annexed in the 1830s into the town of Haarlem. His father Jacob Gaykema was descended from a line of carpenters and construction superintendents, who were originally medieval freeholders from the Dutch province of Friesland. Mother Anna Cornelia van Scherpenseel had a Gelderland/Utrecht background. The infant was christened the same month at the protestant Grote or Bavokerk in Haarlem.

== Education ==
Trained by different teachers, very likely including paternal uncle Haarlem house painter Joost Hendrik Hüne, topographic artist Jan Pannebakker (1755-before 1834) and flower painter Wybrand Hendriks (1744-1831), he refined his art training also at the Haarlem society Kunstmin en Vlijt, which would have been founded by the latter artist. After the years at Kunstmin en Vlijt (1816-1818), Jan worked for more than half a century as an art teacher and as a painter and draughtsman of plants in Leiden, and the then village Leiderdorp. In the years 1824-1837, his paintings were shown at exhibitions of modern masters held in Amsterdam, The Hague and Haarlem. During the first exhibition year, he exhibited in Haarlem, together with the at that time already very elderly Wybrand Hendriks.

== Marriage ==
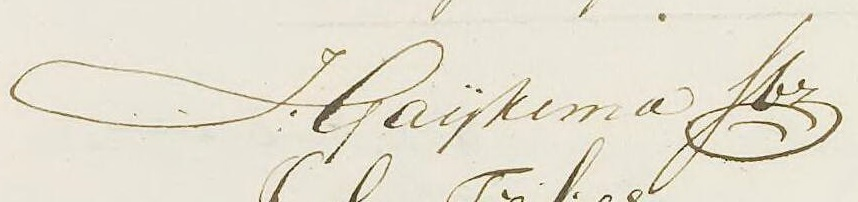
Signature under the birth certificate of his son Jan, Leiderdorp, 22 November 1833.

Two years after the completion of his training, Jan Gaykema got married in Haarlem on 24 January 1821, to Maria Elisabeth van Zutphen, one of the daughters of a master house painter and glassmaker on the Lange Begijnestraat near the Grote or Bavokerk. After marriage, Jan and his wife settled in the city of Leiden. Maria Elisabeth would, in a period of twenty years, give birth to fourteen children, of which eight would reach maturity. In the years 1833-1854, Jan and his family lived at a pleasure garden in what was then Leiderdorp, just outside the Leiden gatehouse Marepoort, which he rented from a Leiden textile manufacturer. Back in Leiden, in an advertisement in the Leydsche Courant of October 1855, he offered his services to youth and probably also to adults as a teacher specialized in flower drawing and painting.

== Body of work ==
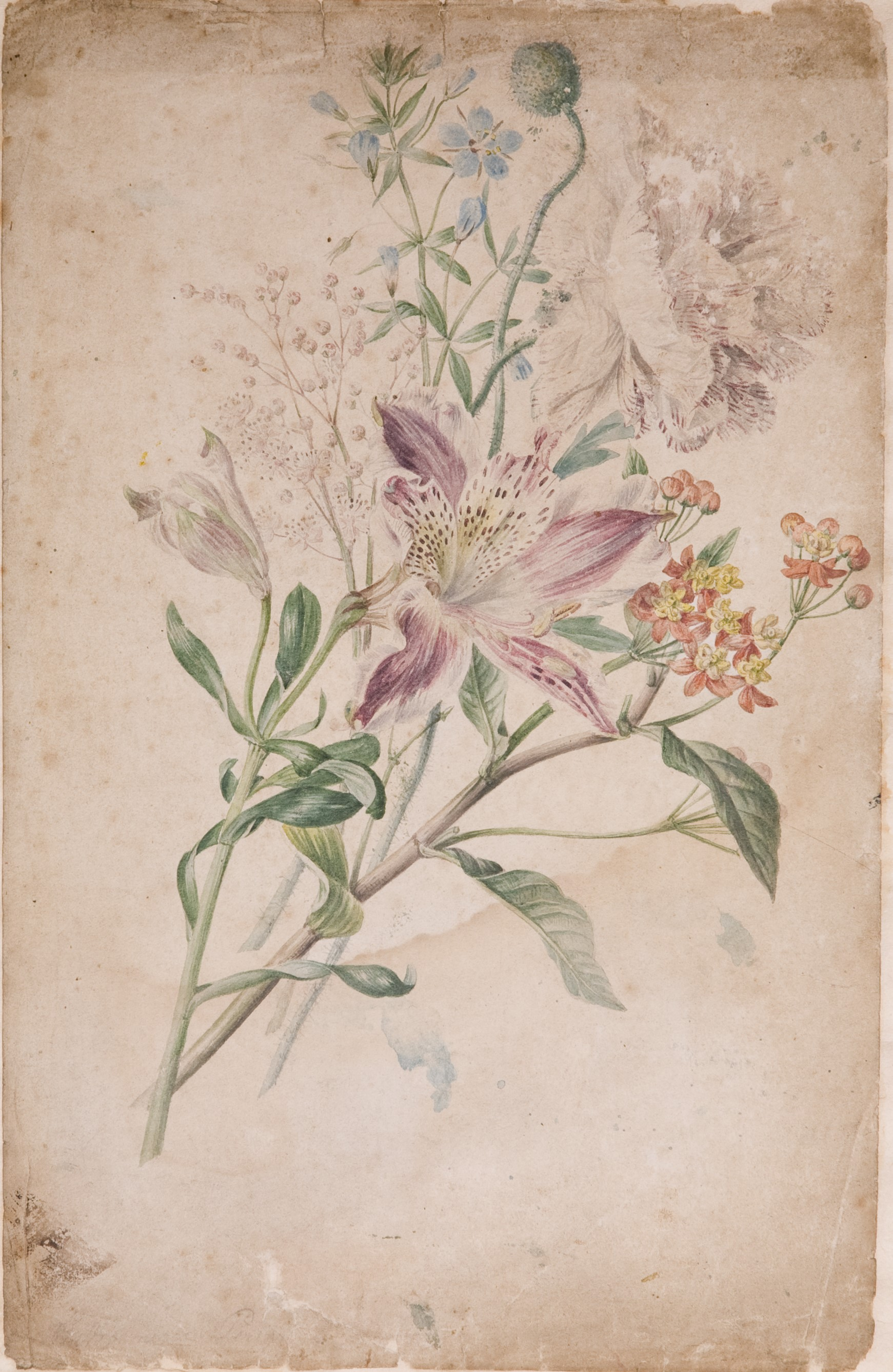
Study in pencil and watercolor of the Papaver somniferum and specimens of the Alstroemeria, Gypsophila and an unidentified plant, neither with monogram nor signed, probably about 1865

Images in private property and catalogue descriptions of oil paintings and botanical drawings inform us of his oeuvre as a botanical artist. Heritage institutions which have Gaykema's work in their collections are Naturalis Biodiversity Center in Leiden, the Teylers Museum in Haarlem and the Gelders Archief in Arnhem.

=== Illustrations for Kruidkunde ===
In 1839-1842 Gaykema made a series of botanical drawings for the scientific survey work on the botany and zoology of the Dutch East Indies, published as Verhandelingen over de natuurlijke geschiedenis der Nederlandsche overzeesche bezittingen by the Natuurkundige Commissie voor Nederlands-Indië (Natural Sciences Commission for the Dutch East Indies). The volume Kruidkunde, written by Pieter Willem Korthals, contains illustrations of more than fifty, until then in Europe still unknown plants, for which Gaykema made the mostly watercolored drawings. Both the original drawings and hand-coloured copies of the lithographs are part of the collections of Naturalis, which donated images to the Dutch heritage web portal Het Geheugen van Nederland and Wikimedia Commons.

=== Illustrations for Annales ===
Fifteen years later, in 1859, Jan Gaykema was able to become the main illustrator of the new international magazine Annales d'horticulture et de botanique, ou Flore des jardins du royaume des Pays-Bas, et histoire des plantes cultivées et ornementales les plus intéressantes des possessions néerlandaises aux Indes orientales, en Amérique et du Japon. This was a publication of the Koninklijke Nederlandsche Maatschappij tot Aanmoediging van den Tuinbouw (Royal Dutch Horticultural Society), edited by professor Willem Hendrik de Vriese, the famous collector of Japanese plants nobleman dr Philipp Franz Balthasar von Siebold, and university head gardener Heinrich Witte. In its short period of existence Gaykema - whether or not he drew them from life in the Leiden Hortus Botanicus - made nearly thirty colored plant drawings, of which the Ghent artist Louis-Constantin Stroobant (1815-1874) made engravings on stone, which were printed in color with the latest techniques by the company of this lithographer. The printed text was provided by the Leiden printing company A.W. Sijthoff, which was still young at that time. After the death of professor De Vriese in 1862 the publication of the magazine was stopped.

== Life's end ==
Gaykema, while still working as an art teacher, died 77 years old, on 16 July 1875, at his home at Noordeinde 53, Leiden, near the corner with the Rapenburg. His remains were buried on the morning of 19 July, at the Leiden reformed cemetery Het Groote Bolwerk. Widow Maria Elisabeth outlived her husband by six years, and in 1881 died in Zoeterwoude, a village adjacent to Leiden.
