= Gardening by the Yard =

- Genre: gardening
- Starring: Paul James
- Country of origin: United States

Original release
- Network: HGTV
- Release: 1996 – 2009

Gardening by the Yard was an American gardening television show which aired weekly on HGTV from 1999 to 2006. It was hosted by master gardener Paul James.

HGTV states that Gardening by the Yard is for people who want their yards to look great but don't have time to spend on them. James focuses on the lighter side of gardening and practices organic gardening. Topics include composting, correct watering, plant zones, vegetable gardens, planting plants that are natural to your area, and many other gardening basics.

Most of the show was taped in James' backyard in Tulsa, OK. James is not afraid to show flaws in his yard, as he claims this makes the show a real gardening program. James often takes the show to locales across the country to visit other gardens or locally owned nurseries. James will also have occasional guest gardeners give their own tips for specific fruit and vegetable crops such as growing fruit trees in containers or designs for the garden. The show has featured many guest stars over the years including James Gonzalez and Alexis Stewart.

2009 was the last year for new episodes, as the series was not renewed. However, reruns continued to be aired on weekday mornings until the end of 2011.

As of January 2012, the show no longer appeared on HGTV's schedule, but visitors to HGTV.com can find short web-cast reruns of the show.

As of April 2022, all 19 seasons of the program are available on Discovery+, a streaming subscription service owned by Warner Bros. Discovery. Episodes have also been uploaded to YouTube.
