= Botanical and horticultural library =

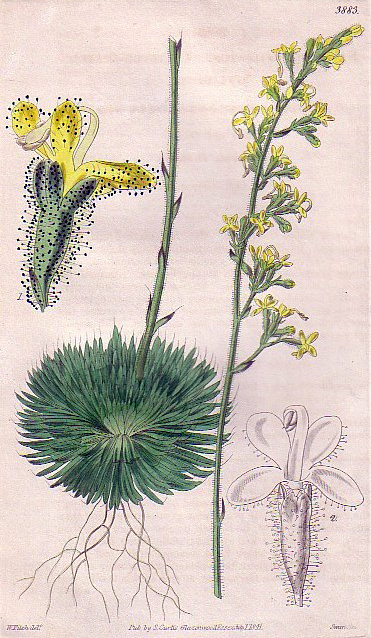
Ciliate-leaved stylidium

A botanical and horticultural library is a library specializing in the preservation and collection of literature and materials about plants. The mission of many botanical and horticultural libraries is to make accessible and available to those who use it the information on this topic.

Botanical and horticultural libraries can be found in arboretums, botanical gardens, research institutions, horticultural societies, conservatories, governmental offices, colleges, and universities as part of a larger university library.

Typical users include members of various public gardens, students of the life sciences, researchers, and scholars.

== Collections ==
The collections within these types of libraries cover such topics as flowers, grasses, trees, fungi, aquatic plants, weeds, algae, pests, and fertilizers. The typical collection is composed of books, periodicals, and photo collections. The types of materials depend on the types of patrons. A public botanical garden library may contain books for children, nursery catalogs, seed catalogs, popular how-to publications, movies, and various other media resources. At an academic library, there may be archived materials, such as historical letters, autographs of famous botanists, plant lists, field notes, and reports of botanic expeditions. Much of the collection in academic botanical and horticultural libraries includes work on the identification of particular plants. Some libraries contain live specimens and preserved samples of plants, referred to as an herbarium.

Libraries may also hold highly specialized collections of certain species. For example, the Oakes Ames Orchid Library at Harvard University is devoted exclusively to orchids. The collection is composed of more than 5,000 journals and books devoted to the classification and identification of orchid species around the world.

== Patron types ==
Typical users include: members of various botanic gardens; students of the life sciences including botany, horticulture, agriculture, biology, herbology, turf grass management; researchers; and scholars.

== See also ==
- Botany

== External links of notable examples in the United States ==
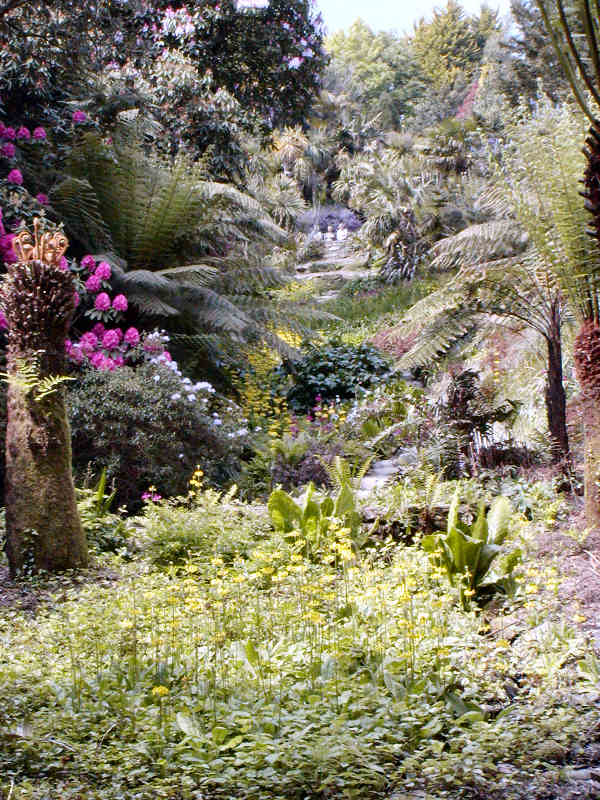
Vegetation at Trebah, Cornwall, UK

- Chicago Botanic Garden Lenhardt Library
- Cleveland Botanical Garden Eleanor Squire Library
- Denver Botanic Gardens Helen Fowler Library
- Harvard University Arnold Arboretum Horticultural Library
- Harvard University Herbaria and Botany Libraries
- The Huntington Library, Art Collections and Botanical Gardens
- Library of Congress Botany and Horticulture Library
- Massachusetts Horticultural Society Library
- National Tropical Botanical Garden
- New York Botanical Garden Mertz Library
- San Francisco Botanic Garden Helen Crocker Russell Library of Horticulture
- University of Washington Botanic Gardens Miller Library

== Other external links ==
- The Council on Botanical and Horticultural Libraries
- European Botanical and Horticultural Libraries Group
