= Head gardener =

Occupation

A head gardener is an individual who manages all horticultural aspects of a property or garden, including staff and volunteers. The properties they manage include historic gardens and private estates, as well as amenity horticulture teams, with a county council.

The responsibilities and required experience of a head gardener vary between roles and properties, but head gardeners are normally expected to be educated to an exceptionally high level within their field and have many years of experience to support their education. In the UK, establishments such as Kew Gardens, Capel Manor College and The Royal Horticultural Society offer training courses for professional gardeners. Some courses also offer a degree, such as Master of Horticulture.

There are many important horticultural aspects of managing a garden such as propagation, productive growing, commercial horticulture, hard and soft landscaping, and management of plant health, including pest and disease management. Head gardeners may need a sound understanding of plant passport (import and export) regulations, as well as a worldwide understanding of preventing the spread of invasive diseases, plants, and pests. Managing a team of volunteers is often an aspect of this role within public gardens or charity spaces such as The National Trust or English Heritage.

== See also ==
- Bostanci-başi
- Landscape manager
- Museum of Garden History
