= Paul James (gardener) =

American television personality

Paul James is an American TV gardener from Tulsa, Oklahoma. Known as "The Gardener Guy," he was the host of the HGTV show Gardening by the Yard from 1996 to 2009. He was the creator, writer and senior producer and shot almost the entire show in his own backyard.

Paul produces content for Southwood Garden Center in Tulsa, Oklahoma where he continues to educate the public about gardening and yard care. He hosts regular seminars at Southwood and had a weekly segment with Taft Price on KJRH Channel 2.
