= American Public Gardens Association =

US non-profit organization

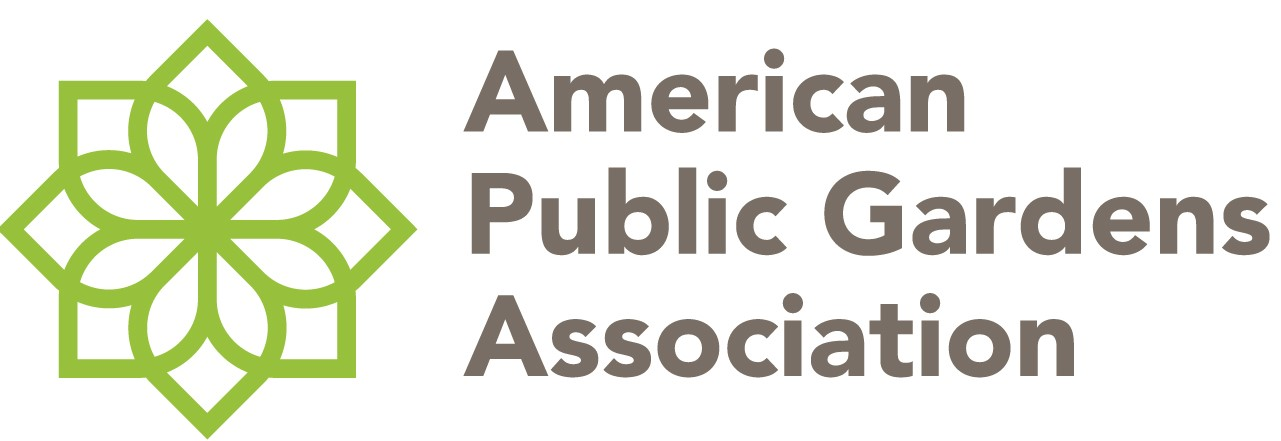
- Type: Nonprofit Association
- Tax ID no.: 23-7110058
- Legal status: 501(c)(3)
- Purpose: advocate and public voice, educator and network
- Headquarters: Wilmington, Delaware (virtual)
- Region served: United States, Canada
- Official language: English, French
- Board President: MaryLynn Mack
- CEO: Michelle Provaznik
- Board of directors: MaryLynn Mack; Bruce Harkey; Brian Vogt; Grace Elton; Ennis Anderson; Carrie Rebora Barratt, Ph.D.; Marnie Conley; Michelle Conklin, CFRE; Charles Hunter; Scott Jamison; Stephanie Jutila; Abra Lee; Ari Novy, PhD; Donna McGinnis; Adriana Quiñones; Toshi Yano, Cyunthia Druckenbrod
- Website: https://www.publicgardens.org/

The American Public Gardens Association, formerly the American Association of Botanical Gardens and Arboreta, is an association of public-garden institutions and professionals primarily in the United States and Canada. Over the last six decades, the American Public Gardens Association has emerged as the premier association for public gardens in North America. Today, the Association's 500 member institutions are located in all 50 states, the District of Columbia, Canada and fourteen other countries. The Association's individual members live in every state, the District of Columbia, Canada, and 24 other countries.

== Programs ==
APGA has partnered with the National Oceanic and Atmospheric Administration (NOAA) to create the Climate and Sustainability Alliance. The Alliance promotes the exchange of information related to global climate change. The Alliance has created the Public Gardens Sustainability Index to offer best practices for gardeners with consideration of the financial, environmental, and social impacts of sustainability decisions.

The Association also administers the Plant Collections Network. As part of this program, APGA has since 1995 partnered with the United States Department of Agriculture’s Agricultural Research Service and the National Arboretum to accredit exceptional public gardens.

== See also ==
- National Public Gardens Day
