= Plant passport =

Identifying label for tracking a plant

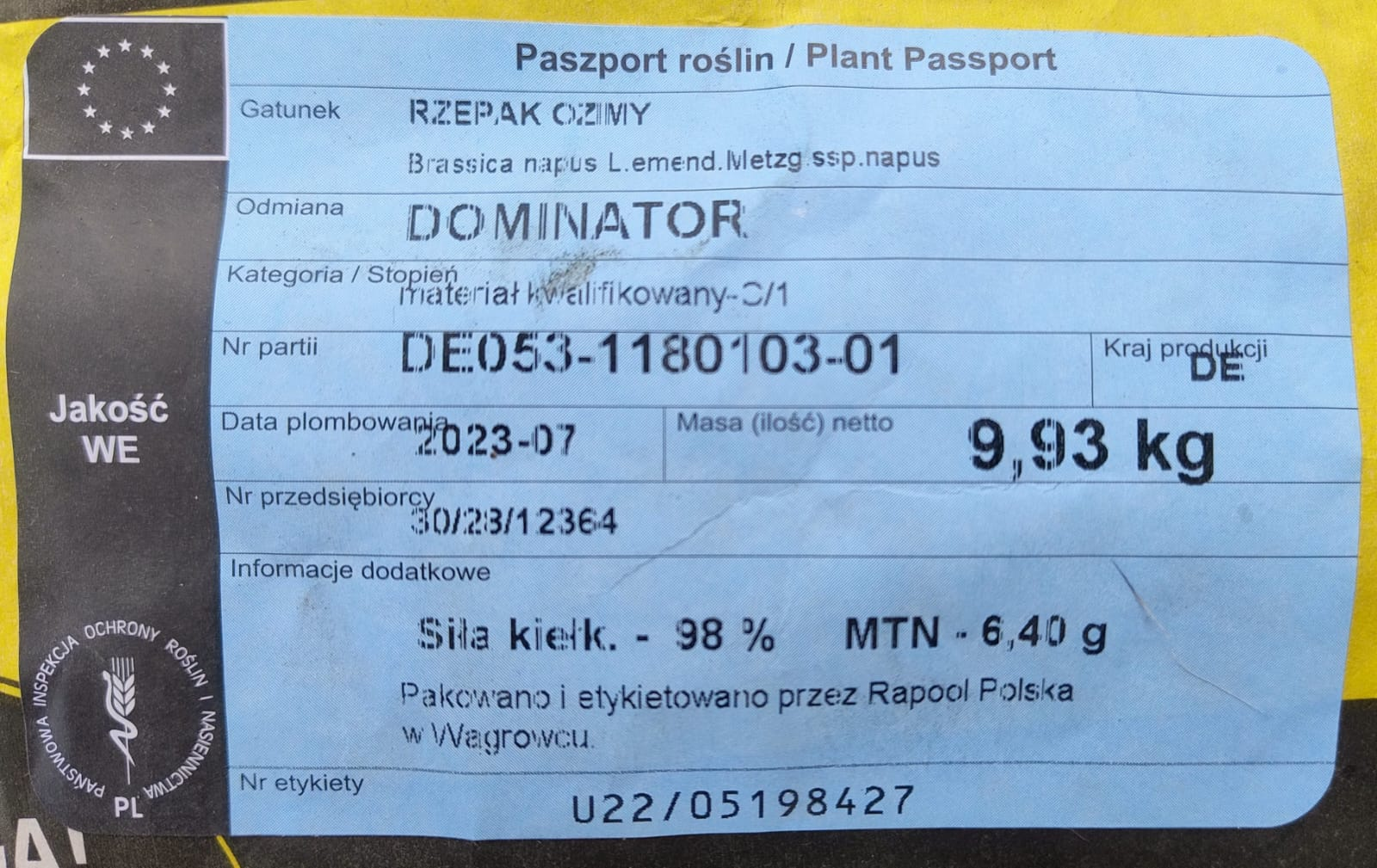
Plant passport issued by Poland tracking rapeseed

A plant passport is an identifying label used for tracking a plant. Plant passports have been required for purposes of tracking plant breed and tracking origin of plant diseases.
