= Lives of the Most Excellent Painters, Sculptors, and Architects =

16th-century book by Giorgio Vasari

The Lives of the Most Excellent Painters, Sculptors, and Architects
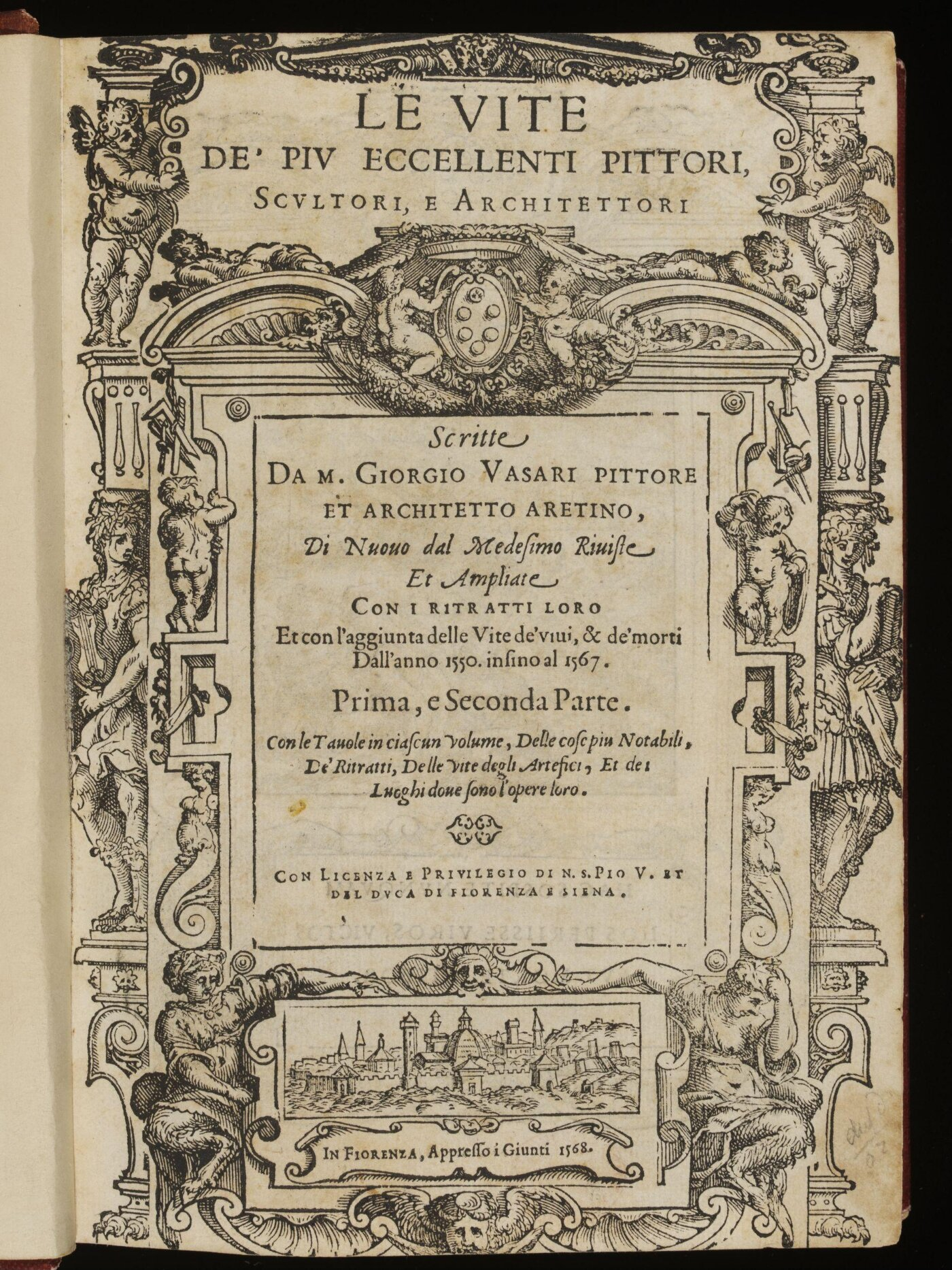
- Title page of the 1568 edition of Le Vite
- Author: Giorgio Vasari
- Original title: Le Vite de più eccellenti architetti, pittori, et scultori italiani, da Cimabue insino a' tempi nostri
- Translator: Eliza Foster
- Language: Italian
- Subject: Artist biographies
- Publisher: Torrentino (1550), Giunti (1568)
- Publication date: 1550, enlarged and revised in 1568
- Publication place: Duchy of Florence
- English publication date: 1850
- Pages: 369 (1550), 686 (1568)
- OCLC: 458416630
- Dewey Decimal: 709.22
- LC Class: N6922 V4924
- Original text: Le Vite de più eccellenti architetti, pittori, et scultori italiani, da Cimabue insino a' tempi nostri at Italian Wikisource

The Lives of the Most Excellent Painters, Sculptors, and Architects (Italian: Le vite de' più eccellenti pittori, scultori, e architettori) is a series of artist biographies written by 16th-century Italian painter and architect Giorgio Vasari, which is considered "perhaps the most famous, and even today the most-read work of the older literature of art", "some of the Italian Renaissance's most influential writing on art", and "the first important book on art history".

Vasari published The Lives in two editions with substantial differences between them; the first edition, two volumes, in 1550 and the second, three volumes, in 1568 (which is the one usually translated and referred to). One important change was the increased attention paid to Venetian art in the second edition, even though Vasari still was, and has ever since been, criticised for an excessive emphasis on the art of his native Florence.

== Background ==
The writer Paolo Giovio expressed his desire to compose a treatise on contemporary artists at a party in the house of Cardinal Farnese, who asked Vasari to provide Giovio with as much relevant information as possible. Giovio instead yielded the project to Vasari.

As the first Italian art historian, Vasari initiated the genre of an encyclopedia of artistic biographies that continues today. Vasari's work was first published in 1550 by Lorenzo Torrentino in Florence, and dedicated to Cosimo I de' Medici, Grand Duke of Tuscany. It included a valuable treatise on the technical methods employed in the arts. It was partly rewritten and enlarged in 1568 and provided with woodcut portraits of artists (some conjectural).

The work has a consistent and notorious favour of Florentines and tends to attribute to them all the new developments in Renaissance art – for example, the invention of engraving. Venetian art in particular, let alone other parts of Europe, is systematically ignored. Between his first and second editions, Vasari visited Venice and the second edition gave more attention to Venetian art (finally including Titian) without achieving a neutral point of view. John Symonds claimed in 1899 that, "It is clear that Vasari often wrote with carelessness, confusing dates and places, and taking no pains to verify the truth of his assertions" (in regards to Vasari's life of Nicola Pisano), while acknowledging that, despite these shortcomings, it is one of the basic sources for information on the Renaissance in Italy.

Vasari's biographies are interspersed with amusing gossip. Many of his anecdotes have the ring of truth, although likely inventions. Others are generic fictions, such as the tale of young Giotto painting a fly on the surface of a painting by Cimabue that the older master repeatedly tried to brush away, a genre tale that echoes anecdotes told of the Greek painter Apelles. He did not research archives for exact dates, as modern art historians do, and naturally his biographies are most dependable for the painters of his own generation and the immediately preceding one. Modern criticism—with all the new materials opened up by research—has corrected many of his traditional dates and attributions. The work is widely considered a classic even today, though it is widely agreed that it must be supplemented by modern scientific research.

Vasari includes a forty-two-page sketch of his own biography at the end of his Vite, and adds further details about himself and his family in his lives of Lazzaro Vasari and Francesco de' Rossi.

== Influence ==
Vasari's Vite has been described as "by far the most influential single text for the history of Renaissance art" and "the most important work of Renaissance biography of artists". Its influence is situated mainly in three domains: as an example for contemporary and later biographers and art historians, as a defining factor in the view on the Renaissance and the role of Florence and Rome in it, and as a major source of information on the lives and works of early Renaissance artists from Italy.

The Vite has been translated wholly or partially into many languages, including Dutch, English, French, German, Polish, Russian and Spanish.

=== Early translations became a model for others ===
The Vite formed a model for encyclopedias of artist biographies. Different 17th century translators became artist biographers in their own country of origin and were often called the Vasari of their country. Karel Van Mander was probably the first Vasarian author with his Painting book (Het Schilderboeck, 1604), which encompassed not only the first Dutch translation of Vasari, but also the first Dutch translation of Ovid and was accompanied by a list of Italian painters who appeared on the scene after Vasari, and the first comprehensive list of biographies of painters from the Low Countries. Similarly, Joachim von Sandrart, author of Deutsche Akademie (1675), became known as the "German Vasari" and Antonio Palomino, author of An account of the lives and works of the most eminent Spanish painters, sculptors and architects (1724), became the "Spanish Vasari". In England, Aglionby's Painting Illustrated from 1685 was largely based on Vasari as well. In Florence the biographies of artists were revised and implemented in the late 17th century by Filippo Baldinucci.

=== View of the Renaissance ===
The Vite is also important as the basis for discussions about the development of style. It influenced the view art historians had of the Early Renaissance for a long time, placing too much emphasis on the achievements of Florentine and Roman artists while ignoring those of the rest of Italy and certainly the artists from the rest of Europe.

=== Source of information ===
For centuries, it has been the most important source of information on Early Renaissance Italian (and especially Tuscan) painters and the attribution of their paintings. In 1899, John Addington Symonds used the Vite as one of his basic sources for the description of artists in his seven books on the Renaissance in Italy, and nowadays it is still, despite its obvious biases and shortcomings, the basis for the biographies of many artists like Leonardo da Vinci.

== Contents of the 1568 edition ==
The Vite contains the biographies of many important Italian artists, and is also adopted as a sort of classical reference guide for their names, which are sometimes used in different ways. What follows is the complete list of artists appearing the second (1568) edition. In a few cases, different very short biographies were given in one section.

=== Volumes and parts ===
The 1568 edition was published in three volumes. Vasari divided the biographies into three parts. Parts I and II are contained in the first volume. Part III is presented in the two other volumes.

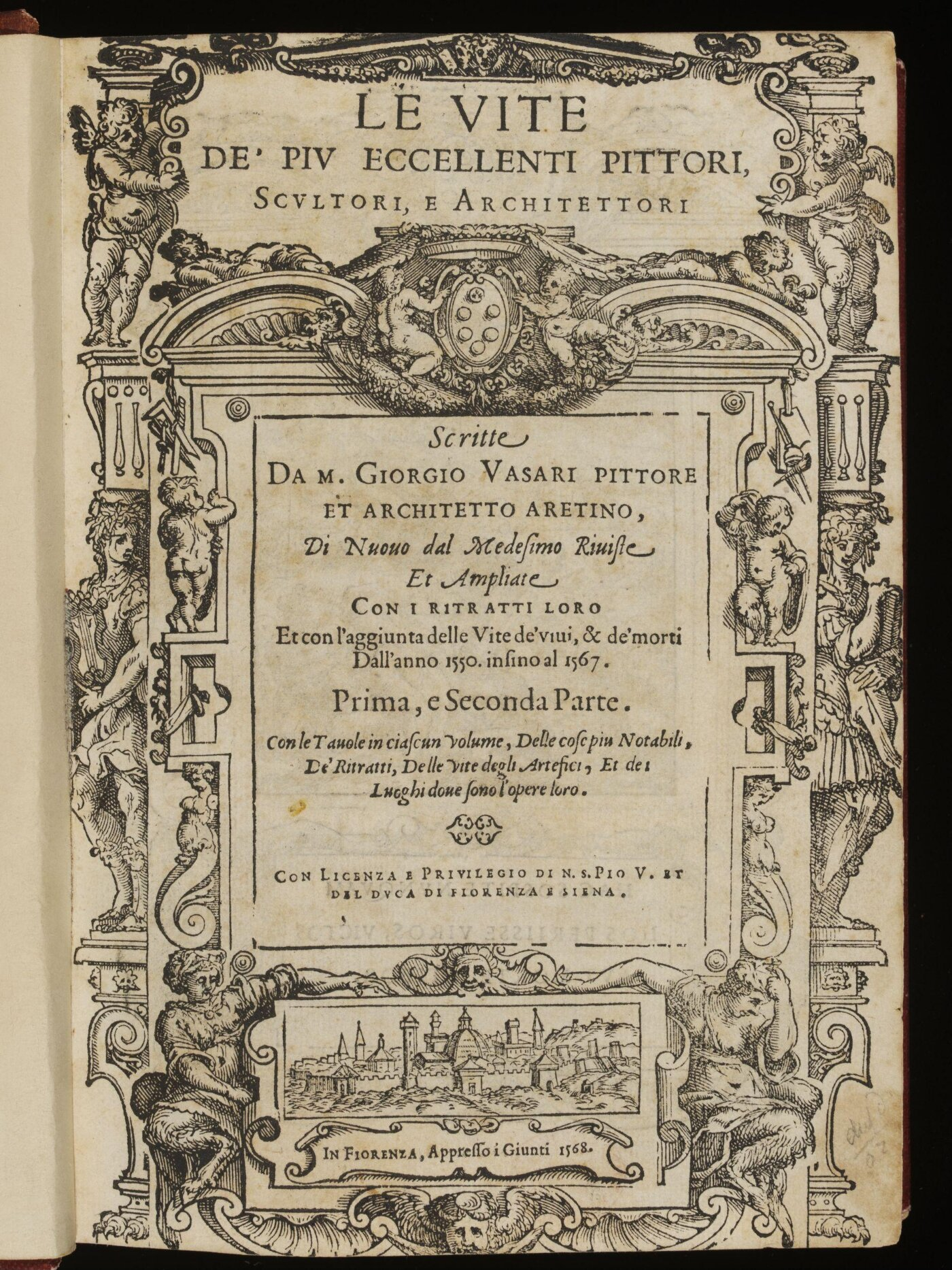
Vol. 1 (= parts I and II)

Vol. 1 (= parts I and II),
title page variant

Vol. 2 (first volume of part III)

Vol. 3 (second volume of part III)

=== Volume 1 ===
The first volume starts with a renewed dedication to Cosimo I de' Medici, followed by an additional one to Pope Pius V. The volume contains an index of names and objects mentioned, and subsequently a list of illustrations, and finally an index of places and their buildings also with references to the passages where they are mentioned in the text. All these indexes are features that facilitate using the book, and are still a model for today's art historical publications. Hereafter an almost 40 pages long lettera by Florentine historian Giovanni Battista Adriani to Vasari on the history of art is printed. The principal part of the volume begins with a preface, followed by an introduction into the background, the materials and techniques of architecture, sculpture, and painting. A second preface follows, introducing the actual "Vite".

Biographies, first part

- Cimabue
- Arnolfo di Lapo, with Bonanno
- Nicola and Giovanni Pisano
- Andrea Tafi
- Gaddo Gaddi
- Margaritone
- Giotto, with Puccio Capanna
- Agostino and Agnolo
- Stefano and Ugolino
- Pietro Lorenzetti (Pietro Laurati)
- Andrea Pisano
- Buonamico Buffalmacco
- Ambrogio Lorenzetti (Ambruogio Laurati)
- Pietro Cavallini
- Simone Martini with Lippo Memmi
- Taddeo Gaddi
- Andrea Orcagna (Andrea di Cione)
- Tommaso Fiorentino (Giottino)
- Giovanni dal Ponte
- Agnolo Gaddi with Cennino Cennini
- Berna Sanese (Barna da Siena)
- Duccio
- Antonio Viniziano (Antonio Veneziano)
- Jacopo di Casentino
- Spinello Aretino
- Gherardo Starnina
- Lippo
- Lorenzo Monaco
- Taddeo Bartoli
- Lorenzo di Bicci with Bicci di Lorenzo and Neri di Bicci

Biographies, second part

- Jacopo della Quercia
- Niccolo Aretino (Niccolò di Piero Lamberti)
- Dello (Dello di Niccolò Delli)
- Nanni di Banco
- Luca della Robbia with Andrea and Girolamo della Robbia
- Paolo Uccello
- Lorenzo Ghiberti with Niccolò di Piero Lamberti
- Masolino da Panicale
- Parri Spinelli
- Masaccio
- Filippo Brunelleschi
- Donatello
- Michelozzo Michelozzi with Pagno di Lapo Portigiani
- Antonio Filarete and Simone (Simone Ghini)
- Giuliano da Maiano
- Piero della Francesca
- Fra Angelico with Domenico di Michelino and Attavante
- Leon Battista Alberti
- Lazaro Vasari
- Antonello da Messina
- Alesso Baldovinetti
- Vellano da Padova (Bartolomeo Bellano)
- Fra Filippo Lippi with Fra Diamante and Jacopo del Sellaio
- Paolo Romano, Mino del Reame, Chimenti Camicia, and Baccio Pontelli
- Andrea del Castagno and Domenico Veneziano
- Gentile da Fabriano
- Vittore Pisanello
- Pesello and Francesco Pesellino
- Benozzo Gozzoli with Melozzo da Forlì
- Francesco di Giorgio and Vecchietta (Lorenzo di Pietro)
- Galasso Ferrarese with Cosmè Tura
- Antonio and Bernardo Rossellino
- Desiderio da Settignano
- Mino da Fiesole
- Lorenzo Costa with Ludovico Mazzolino
- Ercole Ferrarese
- Jacopo, Giovanni and Gentile Bellini with Niccolò Rondinelli and Benedetto Coda
- Cosimo Rosselli
- Il Cecca (Francesco d'Angelo)
- Don Bartolomeo Abbate di S. Clemente (Bartolomeo della Gatta) with Matteo Lappoli
- Gherardo di Giovanni del Fora
- Domenico Ghirlandaio with Benedetto, David Ghirlandaio and Bastiano Mainardi
- Antonio del Pollaiuolo and Piero del Pollaiuolo with Maso Finiguerra
- Sandro Botticelli
- Benedetto da Maiano
- Andrea del Verrocchio with Benedetto and Santi Buglioni
- Andrea Mantegna
- Filippino Lippi
- Bernardino Pinturicchio with Niccolò Alunno and Gerino da Pistoia
- Francesco Francia with Caradosso
- Pietro Perugino with Rocco Zoppo, Francesco Bacchiacca, Eusebio da San Giorgio and Andrea Aloigi (l'Ingegno)
- Vittore Scarpaccia with Stefano da Verona, Jacopo Avanzi, Altichiero, Jacobello del Fiore, Guariento di Arpo, Giusto de' Menabuoi, Vincenzo Foppa, Vincenzo Catena, Cima da Conegliano, Marco Basaiti, Bartolomeo Vivarini, Giovanni di Niccolò Mansueti, Vittore Belliniano, Bartolomeo Montagna, Benedetto Rusconi, Giovanni Buonconsiglio, Simone Bianco, Tullio Lombardo, Vincenzo Civerchio, Girolamo Romani, Alessandro Bonvicino (il Moretto), Francesco Bonsignori, Giovanni Francesco Caroto and Francesco Torbido (il Moro)
- Iacopo detto l'Indaco (Jacopo Torni)
- Luca Signorelli with Tommaso Bernabei (il Papacello)

=== Volume 2 ===
Biographies, third part

- Leonardo da Vinci
- Giorgione da Castelfranco
- Antonio da Correggio
- Piero di Cosimo
- Donato Bramante (Bramante da Urbino)
- Fra Bartolomeo Di San Marco
- Mariotto Albertinelli
- Raffaellino del Garbo
- Pietro Torrigiano (Torrigiano)
- Giuliano da Sangallo
- Antonio da Sangallo
- Raphael
- Guillaume de Marcillat
- Simone del Pollaiolo (il Cronaca)
- Davide Ghirlandaio and Benedetto Ghirlandaio
- Domenico Puligo
- Andrea da Fiesole
- Vincenzo da San Gimignano and Timoteo da Urbino
- Andrea Sansovino (Andrea dal Monte Sansovino)
- Benedetto da Rovezzano
- Baccio da Montelupo and Raffaello da Montelupo (father and son)
- Lorenzo di Credi
- Boccaccio Boccaccino (Boccaccino Cremonese)
- Lorenzetto
- Baldassare Peruzzi
- Pellegrino da Modena (Pellegrino Aretusi)
- Giovan Francesco, also known as il Fattore
- Andrea del Sarto
- Properzia de' Rossi, with suor Plautilla Nelli, Lucrezia Quistelli and Sofonisba Anguissola (the only women to feature in the Lives)
- Alfonso Lombardi
- Michele Agnolo (Giovanni Angelo Montorsoli)
- Girolamo Santacroce
- Dosso Dossi and Battista Dossi (Dossi brothers)
- Giovanni Antonio Licino
- Rosso Fiorentino
- Giovanni Antonio Sogliani
- Girolamo da Treviso (Girolamo Da Trevigi)
- Polidoro da Caravaggio and Maturino da Firenze (Maturino Fiorentino)
- Bartolommeo Ramenghi (Bartolomeo Da Bagnacavallo)
- Marco Calabrese
- Morto Da Feltro
- Franciabigio
- Francesco Mazzola (Il Parmigianino)
- Jacopo Palma (Il Palma)
- Lorenzo Lotto
- Fra Giocondo
- Francesco Granacci
- Baccio d'Agnolo
- Valerio Vicentino (Valerio Belli), Giovanni da Castel Bolognese (Giovanni Bernardi) and Matteo dal Nasaro Veronese
- Marcantonio Bolognese
- Antonio da Sangallo
- Giulio Romano
- Sebastiano del Piombo (Sebastiano Viniziano)
- Perino Del Vaga

=== Volume 3 ===
Biographies, third part (continued)

- Domenico Beccafumi
- Giovann'Antonio Lappoli
- Niccolò Soggi
- Niccolò detto il Tribolo
- Pierino da Vinci
- Baccio Bandinelli
- Giuliano Bugiardini
- Cristofano Gherardi
- Jacopo da Pontormo
- Simone Mosca
- Girolamo Genga, Bartolommeo Genga and Giovanbatista San Marino (Giovanni Battista Belluzzi)
- Michele Sanmicheli with Paolo Veronese (Paulino) and Paolo Farinati
- Giovannantonio detto il Soddoma da Verzelli
- Bastiano detto Aristotile da San Gallo
- Benedetto Garofalo and Girolamo da Carpi with Bramantino and Bernardino Gatti (il Soiaro)
- Ridolfo Ghirlandaio, Davide Ghirlandaio and Benedetto Ghirlandaio
- Giovanni da Udine
- Battista Franco with Jacopo Tintoretto and Andrea Schiavone
- Francesco Rustichi
- Fra' Giovann'Agnolo Montorsoli
- Francesco detto de' Salviati with Giuseppe Porta
- Daniello Ricciarelli da Volterra
- Taddeo Zucchero with Federico Zuccari
- Michelangelo Buonarroti (Michelangelo) with Tiberio Calcagni and Marcello Venusti
- Francesco Primaticcio with Giovanni Battista Ramenghi (il Bagnacavallo Jr.), Prospero Fontana, Niccolò dell'Abbate, Domenico del Barbieri, Lorenzo Sabatini, Pellegrino Tibaldi, Luca Longhi, Livio Agresti, Marco Marchetti, Giovanni Boscoli and Bartolomeo Passarotti
- Tiziano da Cadore (Titian) with Jacopo Bassano, Giovanni Maria Verdizotti, Jan van Calcar (Giovanni fiammingo) and Paris Bordon
- Jacopo Sansovino with Andrea Palladio, Alessandro Vittoria, Bartolomeo Ammannati and Danese Cattaneo
- Lione Aretino (Leone Leoni) with Guglielmo Della Porta and Galeazzo Alessi
- Giulio Clovio, manuscript illuminator
- Various Italian artists: Girolamo Siciolante da Sermoneta, Marcello Venusti, Iacopino del Conte, Dono Doni, Cesare Nebbia and Niccolò Circignani detto il Pomarancio
- Various Flemish artists:
- Bronzino
- Giorgio Vasari

== Editions ==
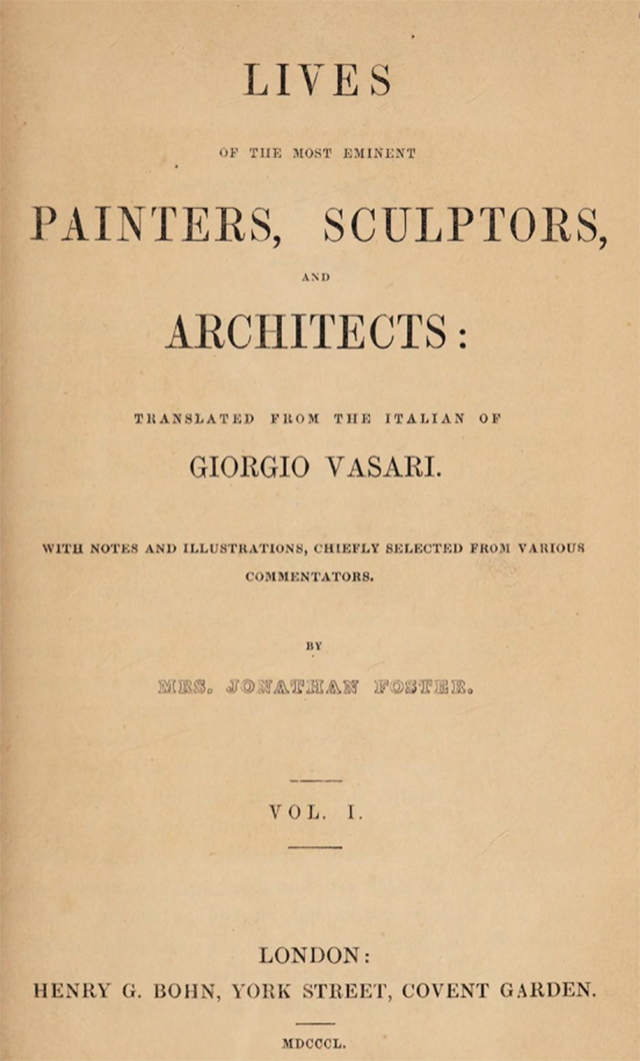
Eliza Foster's 1850-51 translation of Vasari's Lives

There have been numerous editions and translations of the Lives over the years. Many have been abridgements due to the great length of the original.

The first English-language translation by Eliza Foster (as "Mrs. Jonathan Foster") was published by Henry George Bohn in 1850-51, with careful and abundant annotations. According to professor Patricia Rubin of New York University, "her translation of Vasari brought the Lives to a wide English-language readership for the first time. Its very real value in doing so is proven by the fact that it remained in print and in demand through the nineteenth century."

The most recent new English translation is the abridged translation by Peter and Julia Conaway Bondanella, published in the Oxford World's Classics series in 1991.

The modern Italian edition of the Lives was published as The Lives of the Most Excellent Painters, Sculptors and Architects in the 1550 and 1568 editions, 8 volumes in 11 books, text edited by Rosanna Bettarini, with scholarly commentary edited by Paola Barocchi and an index edited by Paola Barocchi and Giovanna Gaeta Bertela, Florence, Sansoni with studies for selected editions in 1966-97.

== Unabridged Annotated English Translations ==
1. Eliza Foster (as "Mrs. Jonathan Foster") published by Henry George Bohn (1850-51) (6 volumes, mostly a paraphrase)
2. Evangeline Wilbour Blashfield (4 volumes, 1900)
3. Louisa S. Maclehose, Edited by Gerard Baldwin Brown (On Technique, published by J. M. Dent & Company, 1907) and Gaston du C. De Vere (10 volumes) (published by Macmillan & Company and the Medici Society, 1912-14)

== Versions online ==
Italian

- 1550 edition Progetto Manuzio (PDF)
- 1550 edition Selections drawn from a 1768 reprint
- 1568 edition, Vol. 1 in the Internet Archive (biographies from Cimabue to Signorelli)
- 1568 edition, Vol. 2 in the Internet Archive (biographies from Leonardo to Perino del Vaga)
- 1568 edition, Vol. 3 in the Internet Archive (biographies from Beccafumi to Vasari)

English

- Giorgio Vasari's Lives of the Artists Website created by Adrienne DeAngelis. Currently incomplete, intended to be unabridged
- Stories of the Italian Artists from Vasari Translated by E. L. Seeley, 1908, abridged

== See also ==
- Egg of Columbus (Lives contains a similar story to the Columbus' egg story)
