= Lappoli =

Lappoli is an Italian surname. Notable people with the surname include:

- Matteo Lappoli (1450–1504), Italian painter
- Giovanni Antonio Lappoli (1492–1552), Italian painter
