= Portrait of a Young Man in Black =

Painting by Rosso Fiorentino

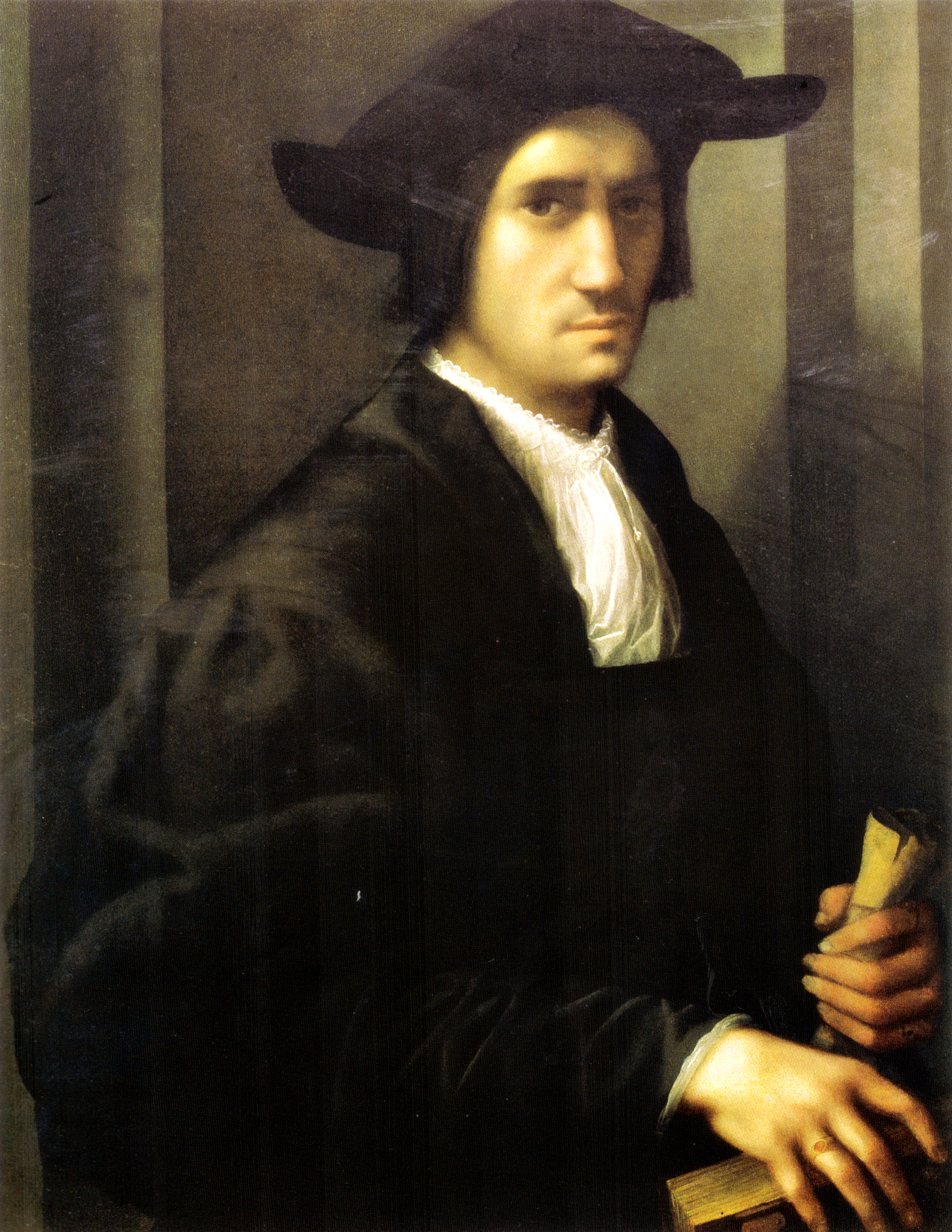
Portrait of a Young Man in Black (c. 1520) by Rosso Fiorentino

Portrait of a Young Man in Black is an oil painting on panel by the Italian Mannerist painter Rosso Fiorentino, executed c. 1520, now in the Uffizi in Florence. Its present attribution was assigned by Antonio Natali, director of the Uffizi, replacing a previous attribution to Domenico Puligo.

Its half-length figure in a black cap and clothes is unidentified but similar in appearance to that in Portrait of a Young Man holding a Letter (National Gallery), produced around the same time. He holds a book and a scroll, both alluding to his job, possibly as a scholar or diplomat.
