= Enrico Castelnuovo (art historian) =

Italian art historian (1929–2014)

Enrico Castelnuovo (26 May 1929, in Rome – 15 June 2014, in Turin) was an Italian art historian, specialising in medieval Italian art. His essays on Matteo Giovanetti published in 1962 earned him a Viareggio Prize, and in 1991, he received a Feltrinelli Prize from the Accademia dei Lincei along with Paola Barocchi, with whom he later on worked on the restoration of the Camposanto Monumentale di Pisa. He graduated from the University of Turin alongside Anna Maria Brizio, and studied under Roberto Longhi at the University of Florence. He subsequently was a professor emeritus at the Scuola Normale Superiore di Pisa, and a member of the Accademia dei Lincei, the Accademia di San Luca, and the Accademia delle Arti del Disegno.

== Biography ==
After graduating in University of Turin in 1951 with Anna Maria Brizio, he furthered his studies in Florence under the guidance of Roberto Longhi. A professor of medieval art history, he taught in Lausanne, Geneva, Turin, and, from 1983, at the Scuola Normale Superiore di Pisa, where he was Professor.

He focused his interests mainly, but not exclusively, on the Middle Ages. He emphasized the historical and sociological aspects of art history, considering in particular the history of the production and reception of works of art, and the role of patrons, artists, and the public. On these aspects, the collection of essays Arte, industria, rivoluzioni. Temi di storia sociale dell'arte (1985; new ed. 2007).

Among his works on specific medieval subjects are: the four volumes of Arti e Storia nel Medioevo (Arts and History in the Middle Ages) (2002-04); Artifex bonus. Il mondo dell'artista medievale (Artifex bonus. The world of the medieval artist) (2004); Cattedrali di luce. Viaggio tra le vetrate medievali (Cathedrals of light. A journey through medieval stained glass) (2007); Medioevo/Medioevi. Un secolo di esposizioni d'arte medievale (The Middle Ages. A century of medieval art exhibitions) (2008, with Alessio Monciatti).

Together with Paola Barocchi, he promoted initiatives for the study and restoration of the monumental complex of the Camposanto Monumentale, editing the volume Il Camposanto di Pisa (1996). He also curated numerous exhibitions of medieval and modern art.

He was a corresponding member of the Accademia dei Lincei and a member of the Accademia delle Scienze in Turin, the Accademia di San Luca, and the Accademia delle Arti del Disegno in Florence.

In 2012, the volume Per Enrico Castelnuovo. Scritti di allievi e amici pisani (For Enrico Castelnuovo. Writings by students and friends from Pisa) was dedicated to him.
