= Joseph and Potiphar's Wife (Properzia de' Rossi) =

Marble artwork by Properzia de' Rossi

Joseph and Potipher's Wife
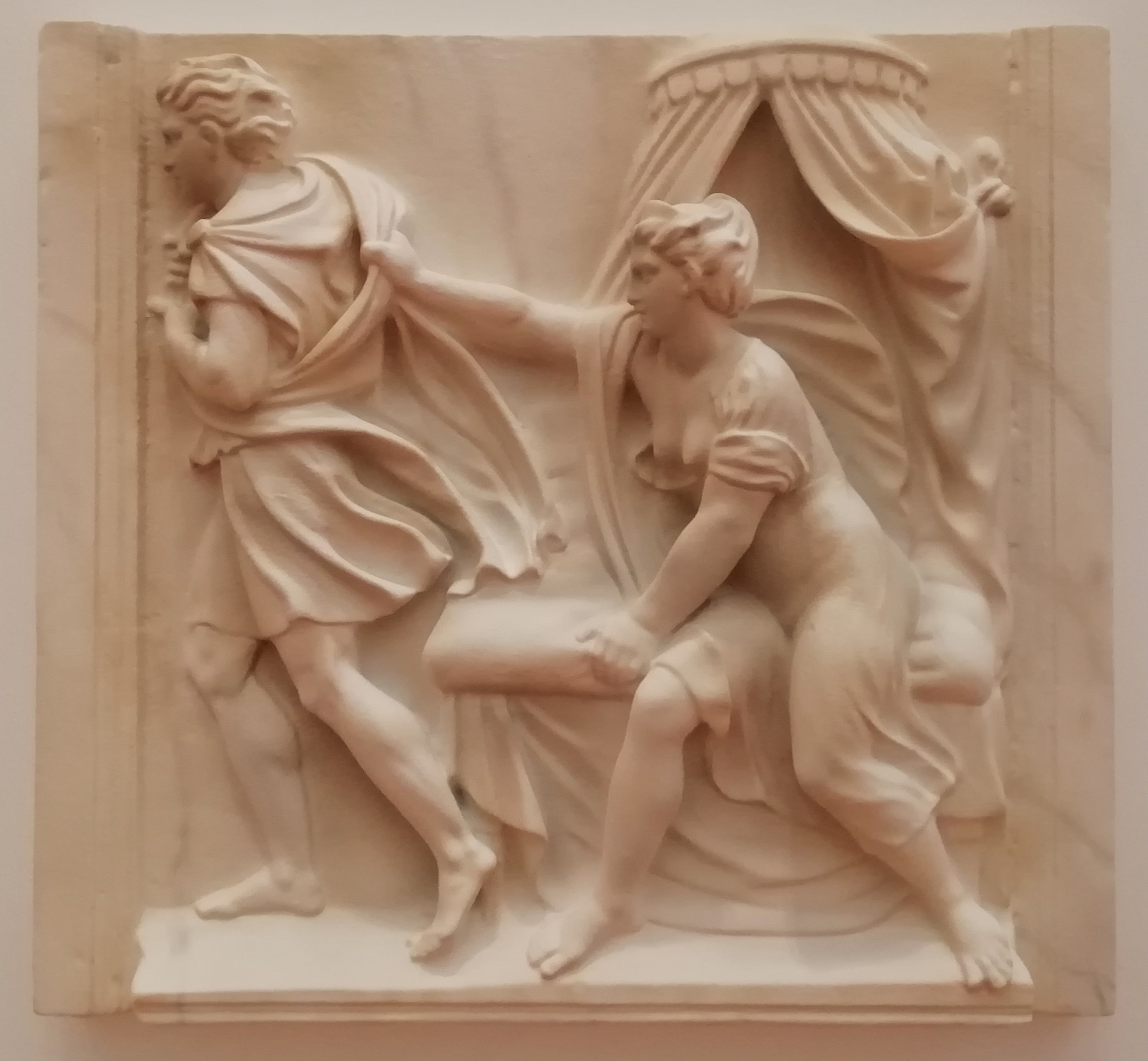
- Artist: Properzia de' Rossi
- Year: 1525-1526
- Medium: Marble
- Location: Museo de San Petronio, Bologna

Joseph and Potiphar's Wife is the only securely attributed work in marble completed by Properzia de' Rossi, the only woman artist in the Italian Renaissance mentioned in the first edition of Giorgio Vasari's Lives of the Most Excellent Painters, Sculptors, and Architects. Despite her inclusion, there is not much information documenting the artist's progression of skill, or who she trained under, leading up to the creation of Joseph and Potiphar's wife. Instead, the artist faced much social backlash surrounding the scandalous imagery and Vasari's own account of the artist's personal connection to the artwork.

== Background ==
The public sculptural work was carved as one of the artist's large-scale projects through a commission for San Petronio, a basilica in Bologna, following her success from her early beginnings of carving peach-pits and plum-stones. She gained the commission through her unnamed husband, who vouched for her to the wardens of the cathedral. Through payment records, it is known that de' Rozzi was hired to create multiple reliefs. Information that specifies which panels are hers is lacking; author Maria Alambratis suggests that the sibyls and angels on the right door of the basilica are the unconfirmed panels. Joseph and Potiphar's wife panel is the only one that can be securely attributed to the artist.

== Subject ==
The relief is a depiction of an early scene from the Old Testament book of Genesis of the moment the enslaved Joseph flees from Potiphar's wife after she attempts to seduce him. She can be seen grabbing at his clothing in which she uses the ripped piece as evidence to falsely accuse him of raping her. Hearing this, Potiphar then imprisons Joseph.

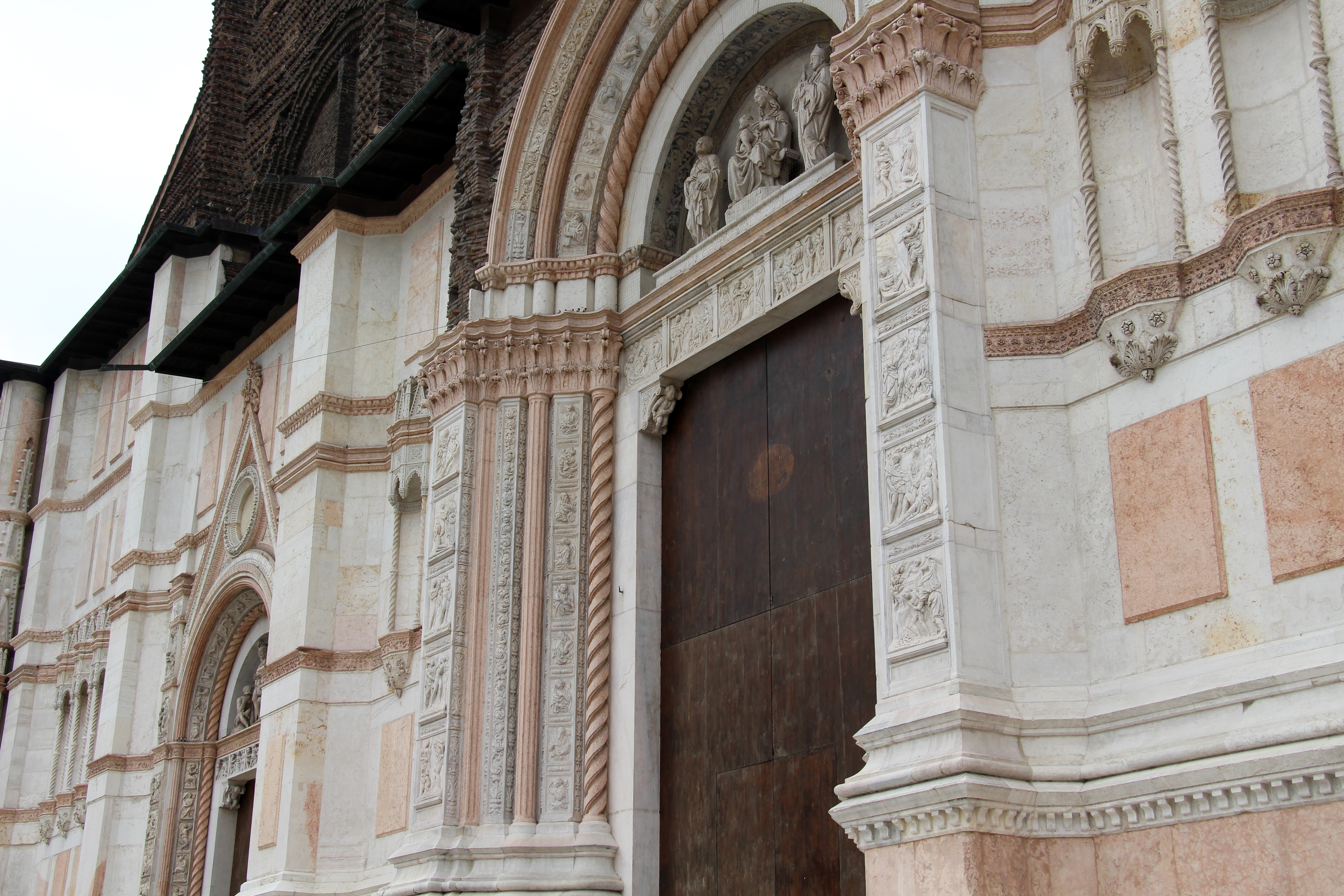
Façade of Basilica di San Petronio - Bologna

This panel was originally planned to sit at the façade of the Basilica di San Petronio in Bologna. Its prominent location at the face of the Basilica makes it a very visible reminder for visitors to resist temptation and maintain piousness.

== Influences ==
It is possible that de' Rozzi was visually inspired by other artists when carving this piece. The succession of strokes present in Joseph and Potiphar's wife are rhythmic, creating diagonal and vertical lines that can be visually compared to compositions by Raphael combined with the soft finish of Correggio's stylization in his paintings, transcending limitations of the medium. The composition flows through an invisible, diagonal line that connects from the top of Joseph's head, ending at the tips of the toes of Potiphar's wife. Additionally, the anatomical accuracies of the relief are similar to that of Michelangelo, showcasing the artist's knowledge and technical ability. This combination of techniques synthesizes into the artist's own personal style, showcasing a very modernistic concept of artmaking.

== Historical Context ==
Women artists were not commonplace in the Renaissance and due to its physical nature, sculpture was an especially rare medium for female artists as it was deemed unsuitable for them to practice. This made de' Rozzi so notable as, despite knowing this, she pursued the practice regardless and is now considered one of the first well-documented women sculptors to work in the Italian Renaissance. Reflecting some views of the time, scholar and author Antonio Saffi even went so far as to argue the exceptional rarity of finding a woman who was able to not only understand the medium enough to work it, but to apply the theoretical principals of the 'most difficult art' with 'perfect success' while standing in front of the members of the Bologna's Accademia di Belli Arti in June 1830.

During de' Rozzi's life, it was common for churches to use visual stories to promote Christianity in their regions. Imagery found in artwork made biblical stories and lessons accessible to even the illiterate and helped regions promote a curated representation of their character. The patron of the artist, the Fabbrica of San Petronio, would have chosen the subject matter of the work for de' Rozzi. She would have been expected to produce exactly what was requested of her, as Renaissance artists were not at liberty to indulge in personal exploration of their subject matter or artistic practice.

== Vasari's Lives and Its Interpretations ==
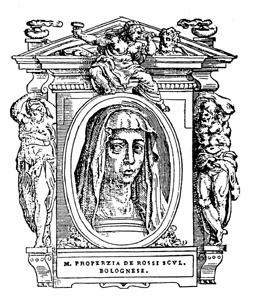
Properzia de' Rossi in Vasari's Lives

"To the vast delight of all Bologna, she made an exquisite scene, wherein - because at the time the poor woman was madly enamored of a handsome young man, who seemed to care but little for her- she represented the wife of Pharoah's Chamberlain, who, burning with love for Joseph, and almost in despair after so much persuasion, finally strips his garment from him with a womanly grace that defies description. This work was esteemed by all to be most beautiful, and it was a great satisfaction to herself, thinking that with this illustration from the Old Testament she had partly quenched the fire of her own passion."

The relief panel was completed in a brief period in the artist's life that received criticism which sensationalized both the work and the artist, taking precedence over details regarding the artist's training. Despite her lack of choice in subject matter, the scandalous imagery of Joseph and Potiphar's wife, alongside its technically strong execution, caused speculation of de' Rossi's personal life at the time.

Vasari's narrative surrounding De’ Rozzi at the time indicated the Joseph and Potiphar's Wife panel to be the “pinnacle” of the artist's career regarding both her ambition and skill. Despite this, author Frederika Jacobs argues that the scandalously popularized social view of de’ Rozzi's connection to the San Petronio panel is supplemented by, and even originated from, Vasari's own views of the panel and artist as presented within the aforementioned section of his Vite.

== Social Interpretation ==
Upon the completion of the Joseph and Potiphar panel, Vasari's passage on the artist sparked a popular assumption about de' Rozzi, a married woman at the time. The scholar's Vite tended to focus on the exceptional about artists and their works making universal claims between artists, their work, and their character—believing that artwork was a reflection of its creator. This belief was not exclusive to de' Rozzi, but due to the nature of her work's subject, Vasari believed that she bore resemblance to Potiphar's wife– not only in appearance but assumedly also in character drawing upon various coincidental parallels. According to Jacobs, some who read Vasari's Vite believed that the artist's own features represented those of Potiphar's wife, and the features of Joseph are those of a young man who de' Rozzi must have sought out with fail.

An example of this popularized view is artist and writer Gian Paolo Lomazzo who stated that in creating this relief, de' Rossi must have been alleviating the sense of loss she felt from this presumed failure; He proposed a likeness between not just de' Rossi and Potiphar's wife, but also compared her to figures such as Sappho, Medea, Thisbe, and Saffira.

The artist also faced harassment from fellow artist Amico Aspertini, who had also been commissioned by San Petronio. Vasari writes that he took these actions “out of envy always dissuaded her and went so far with his malignity, ever speaking ill of her to the Wardens, that she was paid a most beggarly price for her work”. Quin speculates that, due to degradation that this harassment played a part in de’ Rozzi's choice to abruptly switch mediums from sculpting marble to engraving at this time.

Following the social turmoil, de' Rozzi later refused to continue her working connection with the building and her name was removed from the Fabbrica records. According to author Sally Quin, there are no records indicating further artistic productions from De' Rozzi after her work on the basilica.
