= Quistelli =

Quistelli is an Italian surname. Notable people with this name include the following:

- Antonio Quistelli (1949–1998), Italian wrestler
- Lucrezia Quistelli della Mirandola (1541–1594), Italian painter
