= Eliza Foster =

British translator and art writer

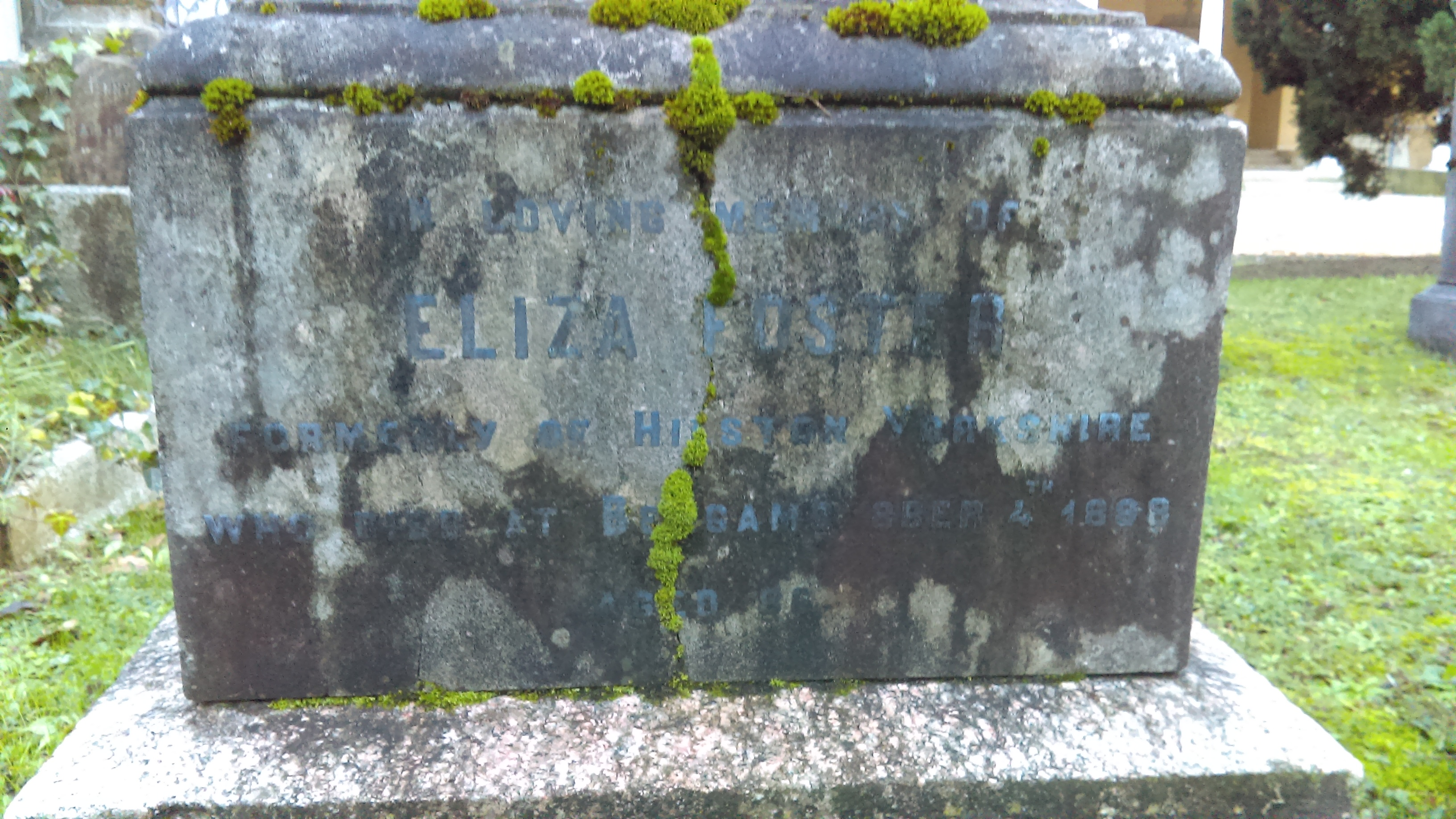
"In loving memory of Eliza Foster, formerly of Hilston Yorkshire who died at Bergamo, 8ber 4th, 1888 aged 86"

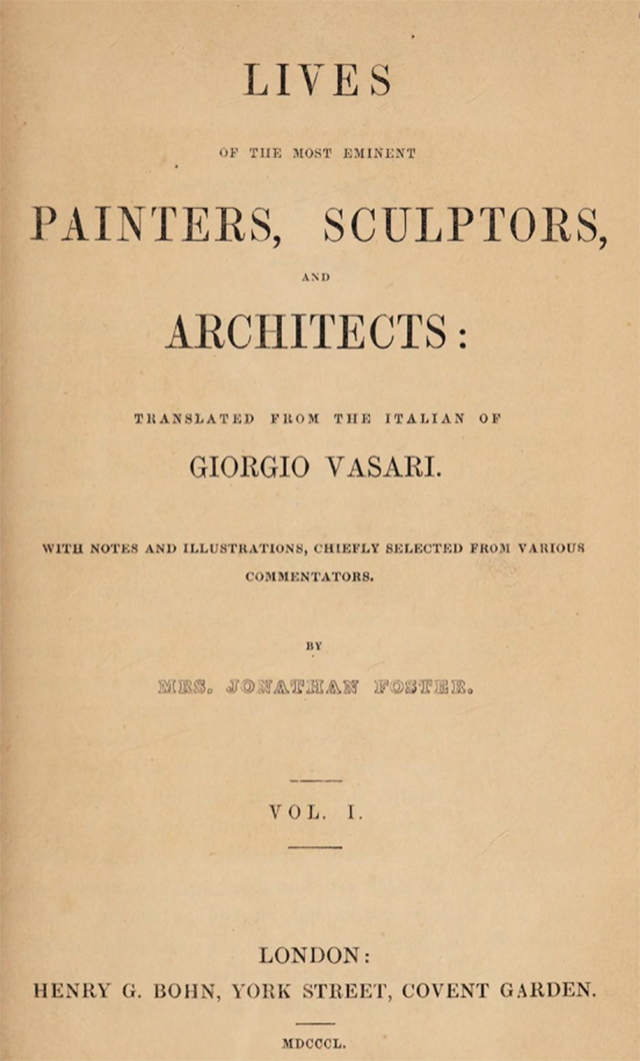
Eliza Foster's 1850-51 translation of Vasari's Lives

Eliza Vere Foster (Cheltenham, 25 July 1802 – Bergamo, 4 October 1888) was an English author and literary translator from Italian, Spanish and German.

== Biography ==
After studying classic and modern languages, and already a widow at 30, on 7 March 1832 in Chelwood Eliza married another widower, Jonathan Foster (Hilston in Holderness, Yorkshire, 1782 – Paris, 1859), with whom she had a son who later worked as deputy commissioner of customs in British India until he suddenly died there in 1870.

Eliza Foster worked as translator for publisher Bohn, most notably by translating and adding careful and abundant annotations to the first English-language translation (as "Mrs. Jonathan Foster") of the 5 volumes of Vasari's Lives of the Most Excellent Painters, Sculptors, and Architects in 1850–1851. According to professor Patricia Rubin of New York University, "her translation of Vasari brought the Lives to a wide English-language readership for the first time. Its very real value in doing so is proven by the fact that it remained in print and in demand through the nineteenth century."

She also translated from German (as "E. Foster") Leopold von Ranke’s History of the Popes for H. G. Bohn’s Standard Library (3 vols; 1847–48), in the preface of which she noted how the ‘noble office of the historian’ required ‘unwearied patience in research [and] a pure conscientiousness and profound respect for the sacredness of Truth’.

As author, Eliza Foster published two travelogues on Bohemia and Saxony (1857) and on Silesia and Austria (1859) with the pseudonym "An Old Traveller", as well as the novel The Boatman of the Bosphorus (1854) under the name "The Osmanli Abderahman Effendi." Together with Anna Maria Hall, Eliza Foster also published a pedagogical volume of Stories and Studies from the Chronicles and History of England (1847).

With the pseudonym of "An Old Traveller", Eliza Foster also published two articles in The Art Journal in 1856 and 1857: ‘Suggestions of Subject to the Student in Art by an Old Traveller’ and ‘Talk of Pictures and the Painters by an Old Traveller’. The journal editor, Samuel Carter Hall (husband of Anna Maria Hall), introduces her as an "accomplished lady" possessing a "very rare" combination of "extensive reading, acquaintance with many languages, the advantage of travelling in several countries, and above all an intimate acquaintance with Art, in the past and in the present". According to Rubin, "Mrs Foster’s contributions to art writing are both representative and real. Her articles in the Art Journal represent the informed taste and moralising opinions typical of mid-Victorian appreciation of art and of its social importance."

After the death of her husband in 1859, Eliza Foster had to rely on her own literary work (and until 1870 on her son) to support herself. She also ensured the education of her two grandsons (whome she taught Latin and Greek) and a granddaughter. As of 1874 she was residing at Casa Finardi, Bergamo Alta. Due to her economic conditions and late-age infirmity, she several times applied and was granted support by the Royal Literary Fund between 1874 and 1883. She is buried in the evangelical section of the Bergamo cemetery.

== Works ==
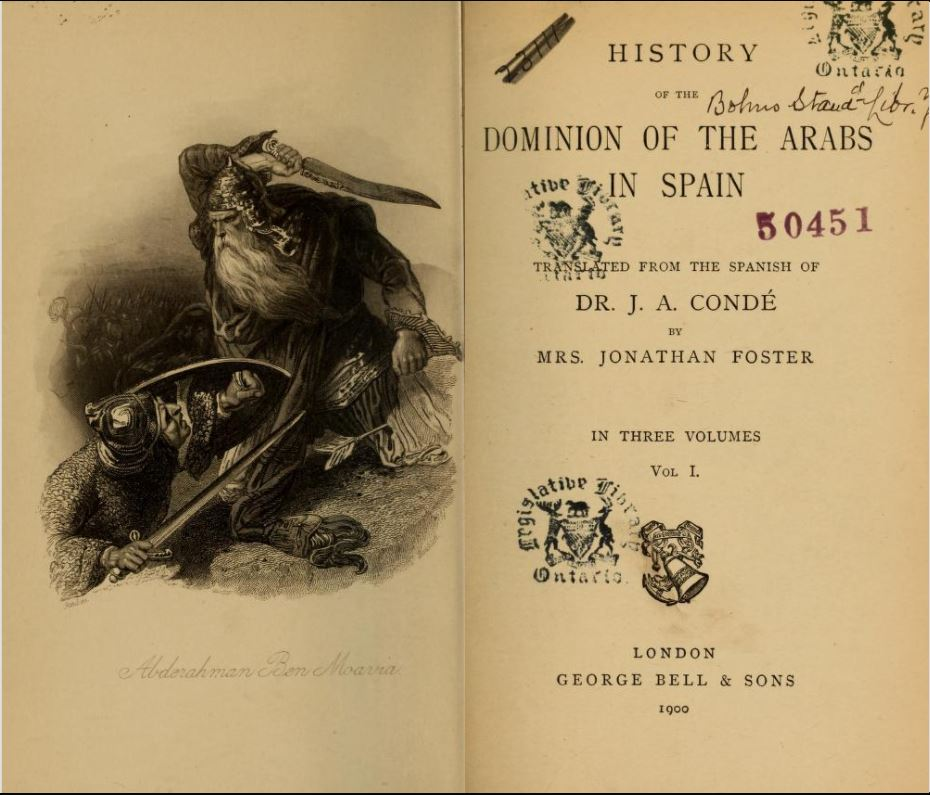
Eliza Foster's translation of José Antonio Condé's History of the Dominion of the Arabs in Spain (1900 edition by George Bell and Sons, London

- (with Anna Maria Hall) Stories and Studies from the Chronicles and History of England (1847)
- (as "The Osmanli Abderahman Effendi") The Boatman of the Bosphorus: A Tale of Turkey (3 vols; London: T. C. Newby, 1854)
- (as "An Old Traveller") ‘Suggestions of Subject to the Student in Art by an Old Traveller’, in Art Journal (1856)
- (as "An Old Traveller") ‘Talk of Pictures and the Painters by an Old Traveller’, in Art Journal (1857)
- (as "An Old Traveller") Travels in Bohemia, with a Walk through the Highlands of Saxony (2 vols; London: T. C. Newby, 1857)
- (as "the Author of Travels in Bohemia") An Autumn in Silesia, Austria Proper, and the Ober Enns (London: T. C. Newby, 1859)

Translations

- (as "E. Foster") Leopold von Ranke’s History of the Popes for H. G. Bohn’s Standard Library (3 vols; 1847–48)
- (as "Mrs. Jonathan Foster") Vasari's Lives of the Most Excellent Painters, Sculptors, and Architects (5 vols; 1850–51)
- (as "Mrs. Jonathan Foster") José Antonio Condé's History of the Dominion of the Arabs in Spain (1855)
