= Paolo Romano =

Italian sculptor

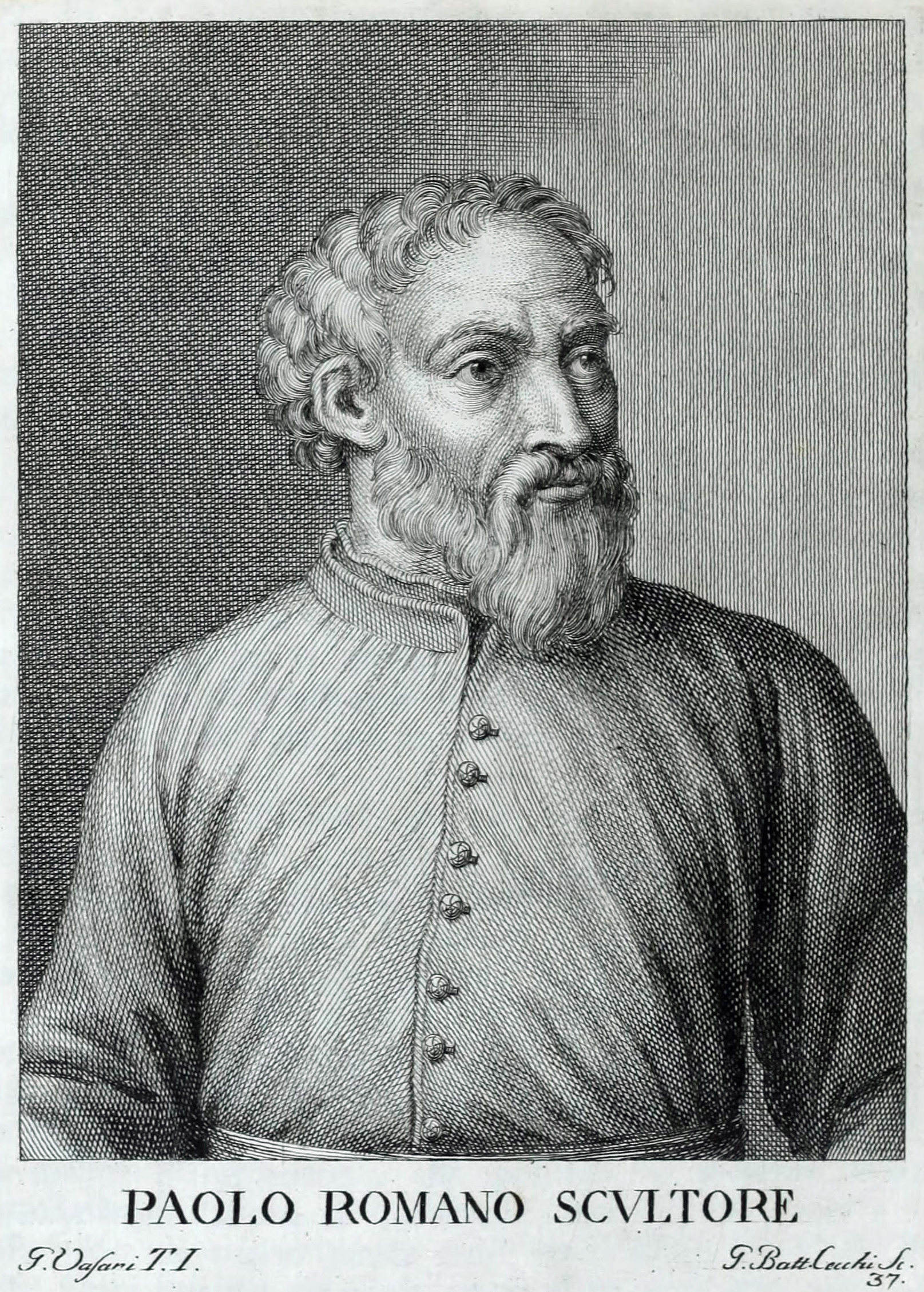
Paolo Romano

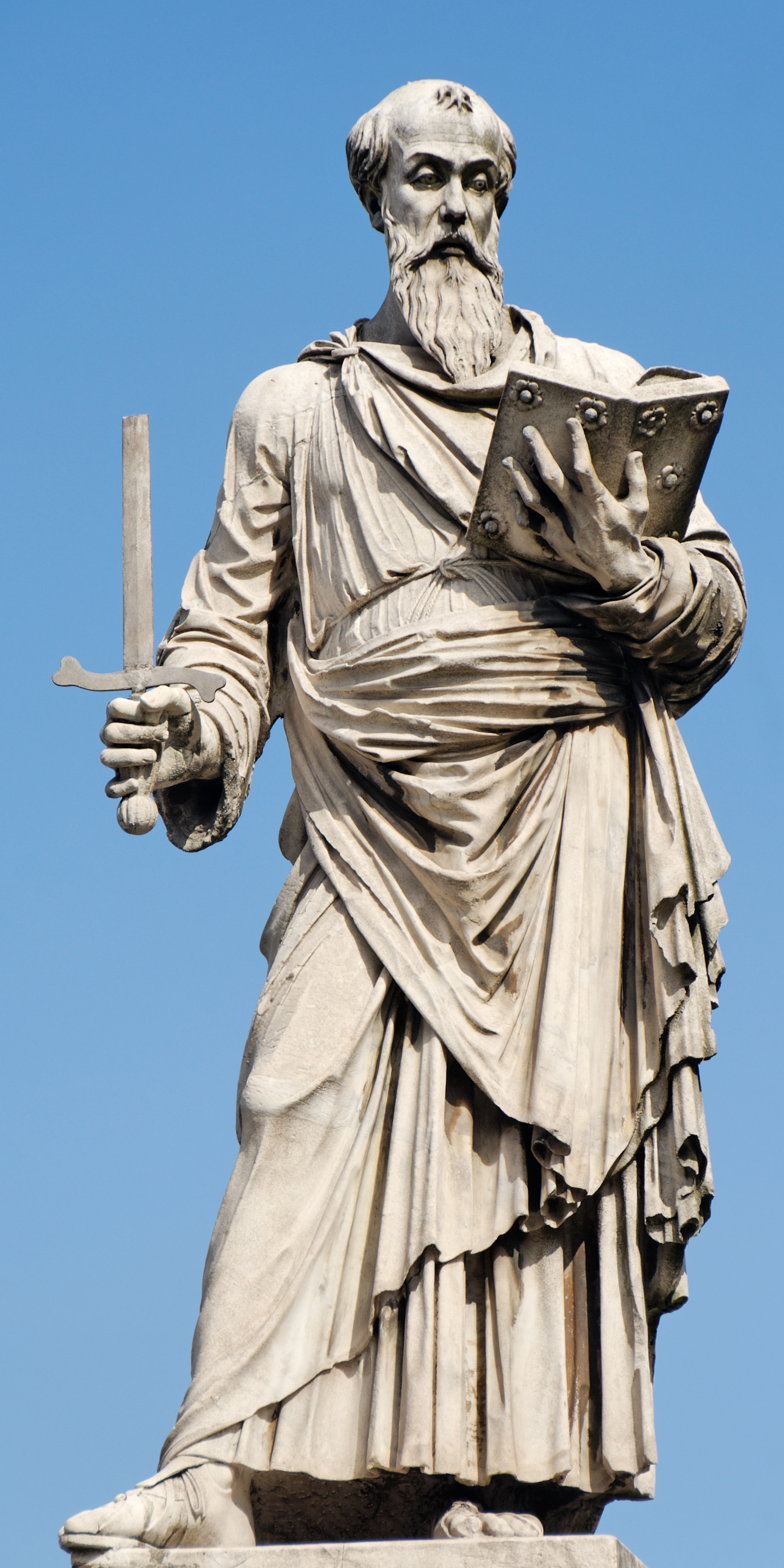
Saint Paul by Paolo Romano (c. 1460), entrance of the Ponte Sant'Angelo, Rome.

Paolo Romano, also known as Paolo Tuccone and as Paolo di Mariano di Tuccio Taccone, was an Italian Renaissance sculptor and goldsmith. He was active by 1451, and probably died by 1470. Giorgio Vasari in his Lives of the Most Excellent Painters, Sculptors, and Architects recounts that Paolo Romano was a modest man whose sculpture was far superior to that of his boastful contemporary Mino del Reame.

The Vatican Museums and the church of Sant'Andrea della Valle in Rome are home to sculptures by Paolo Romano. His disciples include Giovanni Cristoforo Romano.
