= Anna Maria Hall =

Irish novelist

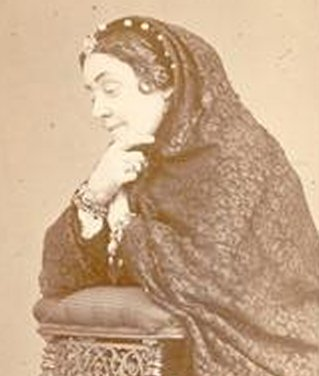
- Anna Maria Hall, ca. 1875
- Born: Anna Maria Fielding; 6 January 1800; Dublin, Leinster, Ireland
- Died: 30 January 1881 (aged 81); Devon Lodge, East Moulsey, England
- Occupation: Writer (novelist)
- Writing career
- Pen name: Mrs. S.C. Hall
- Period: 19th century
- Genre: Children's literature

Anna Maria Hall (6 January 1800 – 30 January 1881) was an Irish novelist who often published as "Mrs. S. C. Hall". She married Samuel Carter Hall, a writer on art, who described her in Retrospect of a Long Life, from 1815 to 1883. She was born Anna Maria Fielding in Dublin, but left Ireland for England at the age of 15.

== Life ==
Hall was born in Dublin on 6 January 1800. She lived with her mother, a widow named Sarah Elizabeth Fielding, and stepfather, George Carr of Graigie, Wexford, until 1815. Mother and daughter came to England in 1815. Anna Maria was educated in part by Frances Arabella Rowden, who was not only a poet, but, according to Mary Mitford, "had a knack of making poetesses of her pupils" This ties Anna Maria to other pupils of Rowden, such as later Rosina Doyle Wheeler; Caroline Ponsonby, later Lady Caroline Lamb; the poet Letitia Elizabeth Landon ("L.E.L."); and Emma Roberts, the travel writer.

On 20 September 1824, Anna Maria married Samuel Carter Hall. Her mother lived with them in London until she died.

Mrs Hall's first recorded contribution to literature is an Irish sketch called "Master Ben", which appeared in The Spirit and Manners of the Age, January 1829, pp. 35–41 et seq. Other tales followed. Eventually they were collected into a volume entitled Sketches of Irish Character, 1829, and henceforth she was an author by profession. The next year, she issued a little volume for children, Chronicles of a School-Room, consisting of a series of simple tales.

In 1831, Hall published a second series of 'Sketches of Irish Character', fully equal to the first, which was well received. The first of her nine novels, The Buccaneer (1832), is a story of the time of the Protectorate, and Oliver Cromwell is among the characters. To the New Monthly Magazine, which her husband was editing, she contributed Lights and Shadows of Irish Life, articles which were republished in three volumes in 1838. The principal tale in this collection, "The Groves of Blarney", was dramatised with considerable success by the author, with the object of supplying a character for Tyrone Power, and ran for a whole season at the Adelphi Theatre in 1838. Hall also wrote The French Refugee, produced at the St. James's Theatre in 1836, where it ran for 90 nights, and for the same theatre Mabel's Curse, in which John Pritt Harley played the leading part.

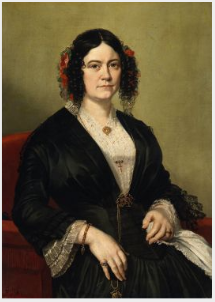
Anna Maria Hall by G. de Latre, 1851

Another of her dramas, of which she had neglected to keep a copy, was Who's Who? which was in the possession of Tyrone Power when he was lost in the SS President in April 1841. In 1840, she issued what has been called the best of her novels, Marian, or a Young Maid's Fortunes, in which her knowledge of Irish character is again displayed in a style equal to anything written by Maria Edgeworth. Her next work was a series of Stories of the Irish Peasantry, contributed to Chambers's Edinburgh Journal and afterwards published in a collected form. In 1840, she aided her husband in a book chiefly composed by him, Ireland, its Scenery, Characters, &c. She edited the St. James's Magazine in 1862–63.

In The Art Journal, edited by her husband, Hall brought out "Pilgrimages to English Shrines" in 1849, and here the most beautiful of all her books, Midsummer Eve, a Fairy Tale of Love, was serialized. One of her last works, Boons and Blessings (1875), dedicated to Anthony Ashley-Cooper, 7th Earl of Shaftesbury, is a collection of temperance tales, illustrated by good artists.

Hall's sketches of her native land bear a closer resemblance to the tales of Mary Russell Mitford than to the Irish stories of John Banim or Gerald Griffin. They contain fine rural descriptions and are animated by a healthy tone of moral feeling and a vein of delicate humour. Her books were never popular in Ireland, as she saw in the Orangemen and the Roman Catholics much to praise and much to blame, so that she failed to please either of them.

On 10 December 1868, she was granted a civil list pension of £100 a year. She was instrumental in founding the Hospital for Consumption at Brompton (now the Royal Brompton Hospital), the Governesses' Institute (presumably the School Mistresses and Governesses’ Benevolent Institution), the Home for Decayed Gentlewomen (see Elizabeth Finn Care formerly the Distressed Gentlefolks' Aid Association), and the Nightingale Fund (used to set up what is now the Florence Nightingale Faculty of Nursing and Midwifery). Her benevolence was of the most practical nature; she worked for the temperance cause, for women's rights, and for the friendless and fallen. She was a friend to street musicians, and a thorough believer in spiritualism; but this belief did not prevent her from remaining a devout Christian.

She kept the 50th anniversary of her wedding day on 20 September 1874. She died at Devon Lodge, East Moulsey, 30 January 1881, and was buried in Addlestone churchyard, 5 February.

== Works ==
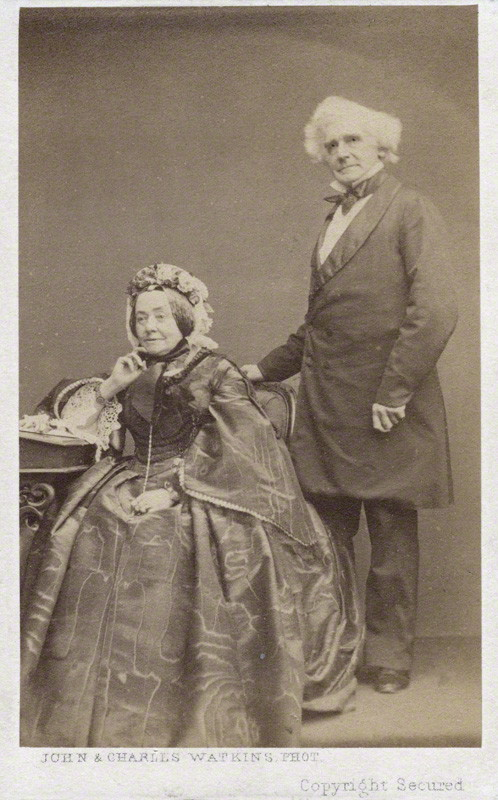
Albumen carte de visite, late 1860s

Other works were The Buccaneer, Can Wrong Be Right? and many sketches in the Art Journal, of which her husband Samuel Carter Hall was editor, and Sharpe's London Magazine. With her husband she also collaborated on a work entitled Ireland: Its Scenery, Character, etc. (1841–43).

== See also ==
- Eliza Foster

== Sources ==
- Hamilton, C. J. (1900). "Mrs. S. C. Hall" . Notable Irishwomen. Dublin: Sealy, Bryers & Walker. pp. 128–141.
