= Simone Ghini =

Italian sculptor

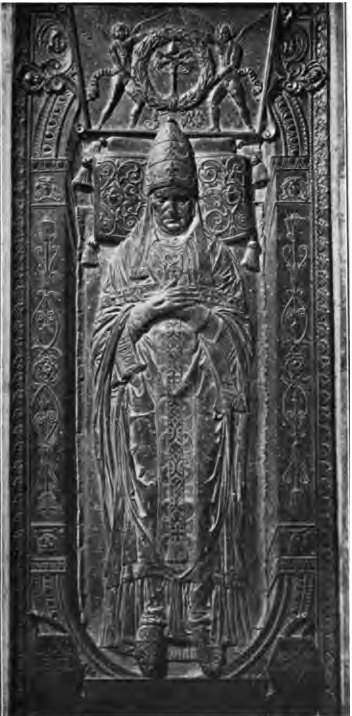
The tomb of Pope Martin V by Ghini

Simone Ghini, also known as Simone Ghini I and as Simone I di Giovanni di Simone Ghini, was an Italian Renaissance sculptor from Florence who was born in 1406 or 1407. He is best known for his funeral monument to Pope Martin V, in the Basilica of St. John Lateran, in Rome. Together with Antonio Filarete, Simone also made a set of bronze doors for St. Peter's Basilica in Rome. Giorgio Vasari in his Lives of the Most Excellent Painters, Sculptors, and Architects erroneously stated that Simone was the brother of Donatello. Simone Ghini died in 1491.

== See also ==
- Renaissance art

== Bibliography ==
- Thieme, Ulrich and Felix Becker, editors, Allgemeines Lexikon der bildenden Künstler von der Antike bis zur Gegenwart. Reprint of 1907 edition, Leipzig, Veb E.A. Seemann Verlag, 1980–1986.
- Vasari, Giorgio, Le Vite delle più eccellenti pittori, scultori, ed architettori, many editions and translations.
