= Andrea Tafi (artist) =

Artist from Italy

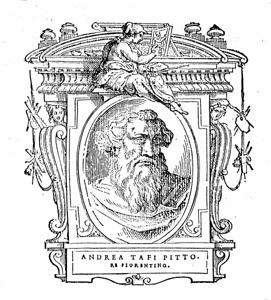
Portrait of Andrea Tafi from Vasari's Lives

Andrea Tafi (1213–1294) was an Italian artist. He is probably best known for his work on the mosaics of the Baptistery in Florence, which were started in 1225 by Jacobus. His pupils included Buonamico Buffalmacco.

Tafi is shown in Frederic Leighton's Cimabue's Celebrated Madonna (1853–1855); the subject matter of this painting is based on Giorgio Vasari's account of how the Rucellai Madonna was carried from Cimabue's home to the church of Santa Maria Novella in Florence.

Vasari includes a biography of Andrea Tafi in his Lives; the biography includes a tale of how Buonamico di Cristofano stopped Tafi from rising so early by pretending to be a demon.

== Bibliography ==
- Dalton, Ormonde Maddock (1911). Byzantine Art and Archaeology. New York, NY: Dove Publications Inc.
