= Mino del Reame =

Italian sculptor

Mino del Reame, also known as Mino dal Reame, was a 15th-century Neapolitan Italian Renaissance sculptor from Naples.

== History ==
He was active in Rome from about 1460 to 1480.

Giorgio Vasari in his Lives of the Most Excellent Painters, Sculptors, and Architects recounts that Mino del Reame was a boastful sculptor whose work was inferior to that of his modest contemporary Paolo Romano.

The Cleveland Museum of Art has sculptures by Mino del Reame in its collection.
