= Simone Bianco =

Italian sculptor

- Born: c. 1480–90; Loro Ciuffenna, Duchy of Florence (in modern Tuscany, Italy)
- Died: after 1553; Venice, Republic of Venice (in modern Italy)
- Known for: Portrait busts
- Movement: Italian Renaissance

Simone di Niccolò Bianco (1480s – after 1553), was an Italian Renaissance sculptor.

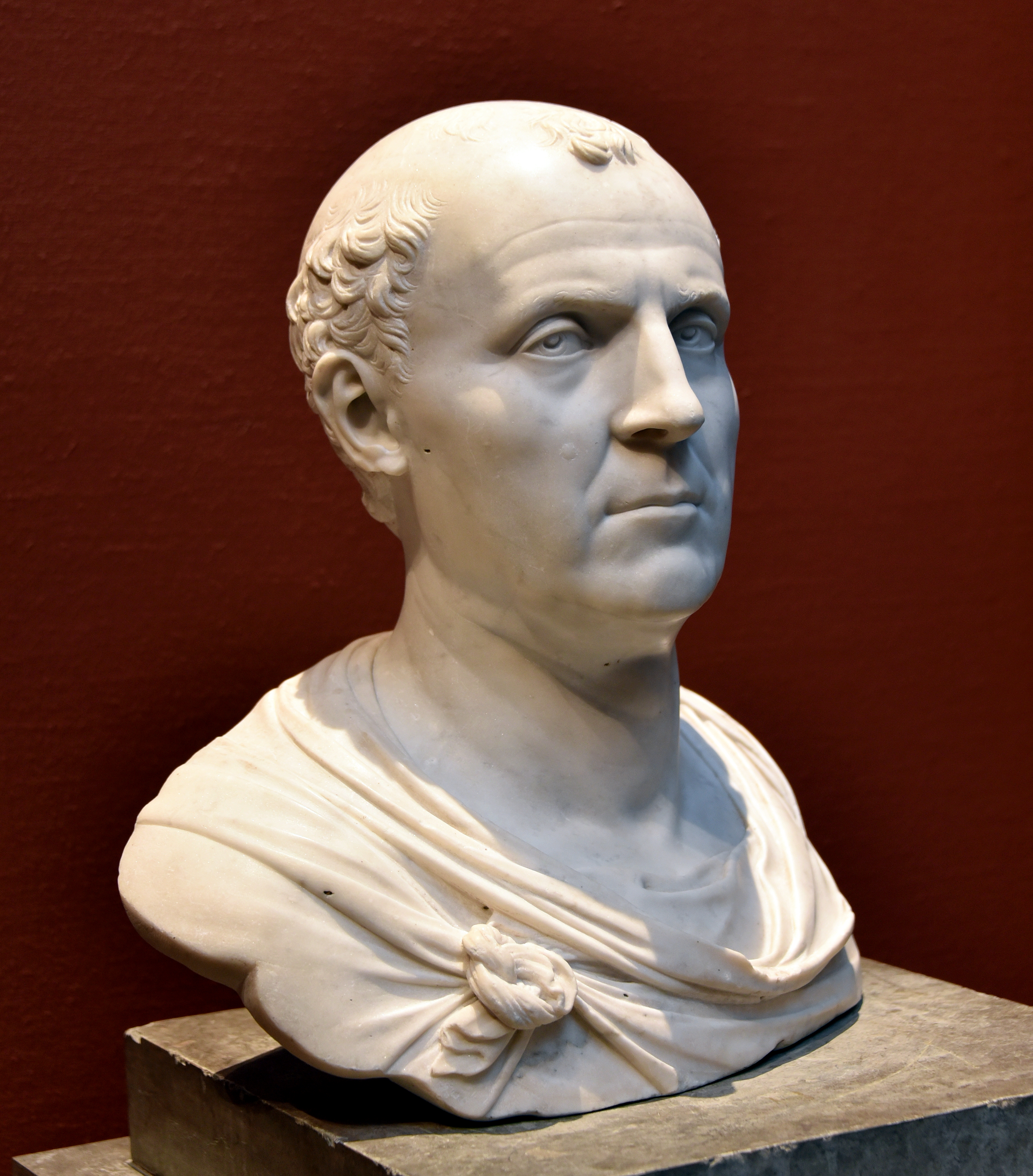
Marble bust of an unknown Roman, by Bianco

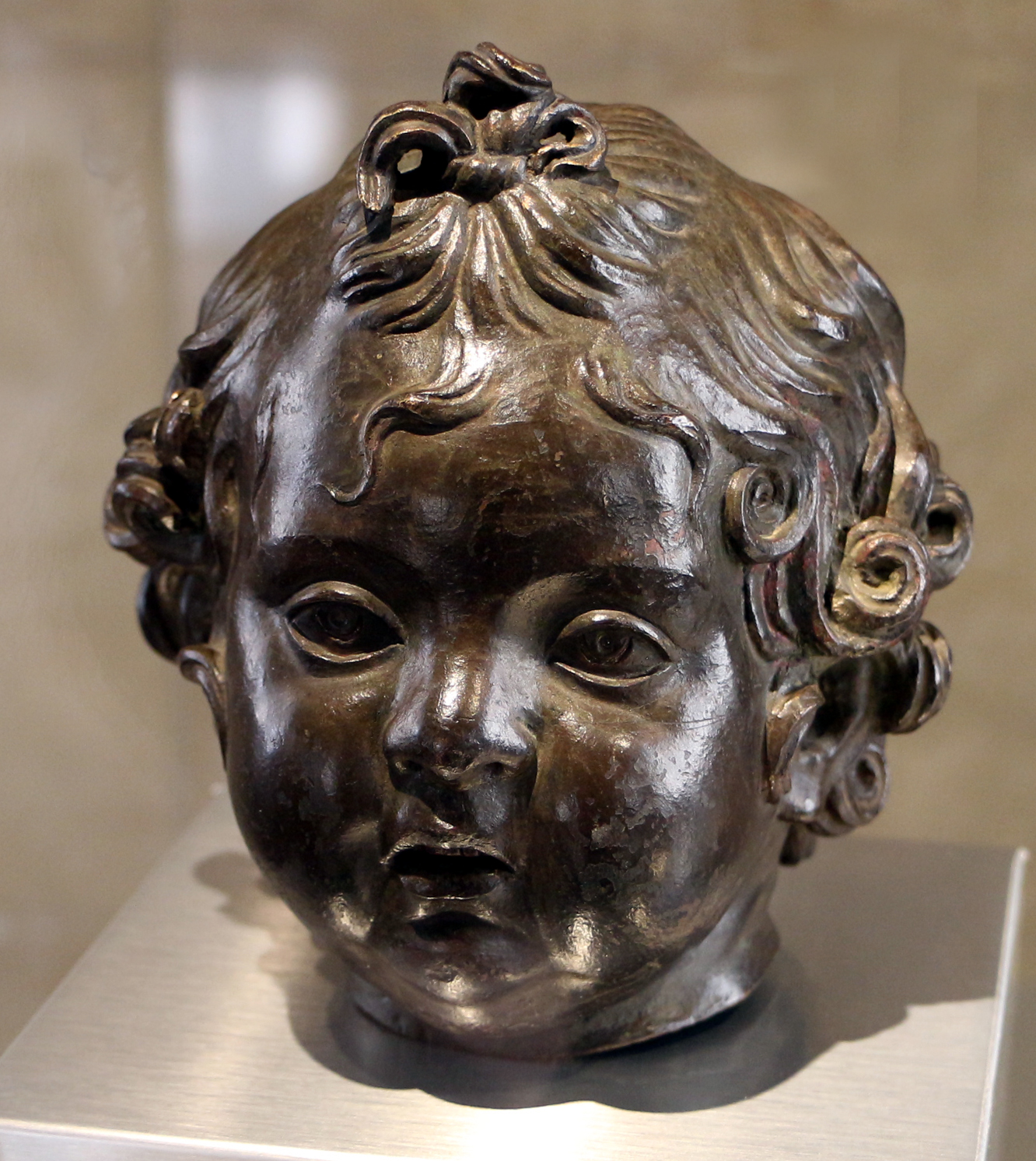
Bronze head of a child, by Bianco

Born in Loro Ciuffenna, Tuscany, he spent his artistic career in Venice from 1512 onwards. He was known for sculpture of busts in marble and bronze all'antica. Bianco was highly regarded by Johann Christoph Fugger and Pietro Aretino, and by Giorgio Vasari who gave him a brief mention in his Lives of the Artists.
