= Jacopo Torni =

Italian painter

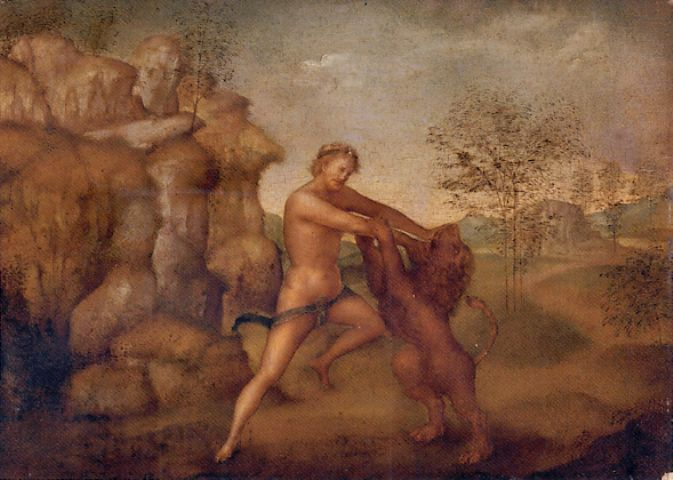
Hercules and the Nemean Lion, oil on panel painting attributed to Jacopo Torni

Jacopo Torni (1476–1526), also known as Jacobo Fiorentin, L'Indaco, and Jacopo dell'Indaco, was an Italian (Florentine) painter, sculptor and architect.

He was a student of Domenico Ghirlandaio (1449–1494), and the brother of painter Francesco Torni (1492–1560). Jacopo assisted Michelangelo in painting the ceiling of the Sistine Chapel in Rome, and, according to Giorgio Vasari in his Lives of the Most Excellent Painters, Sculptors, and Architects, “lived in very close intimacy with Michelangelo” (Jonathan Foster translation). Jacopo is known to have collaborated with the painter Bernardino Pinturicchio (ca. 1452–1513).

He settled and worked in Spain before 1520 and died in Villena. Some of his works as architect and sculptor remain in Granada and Murcia.

He invented a plaster formula resistant to mold, which entered the Italian building and fresco tradition.
