= Portrait of a Young Man Holding a Letter =

1518 painting by Rosso Fiorentino

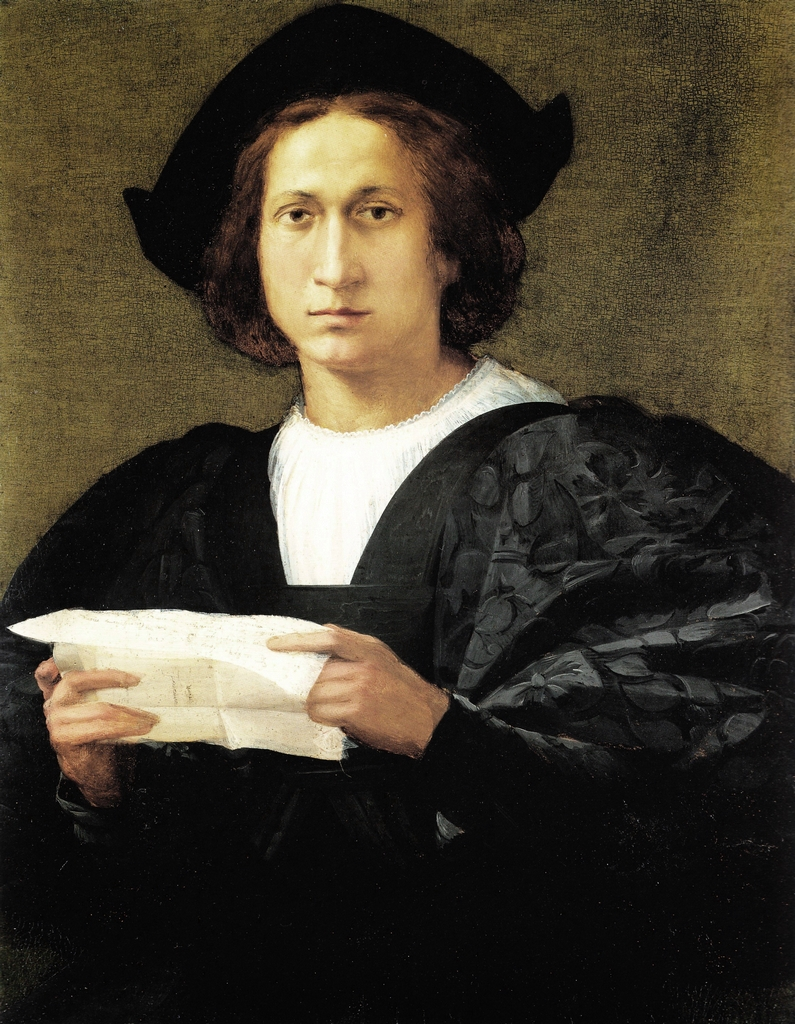
Portrait of Young Man Holding a Letter (1518) by Rosso Fiorentino

Portrait of a Young Man Holding a Letter is an oil-on-panel painting by Rosso Fiorentino, executed in 1518, now in the National Gallery, London. It is dated 22 June 1518 on the letter held by the unidentified young man in black hat and clothes.

In his Lives of the Artists Vasari briefly mentions that many portraits by Fiorentino could still be seen in Florentine homes, probably produced before Rosso left for Volterra in 1521 – this work is thought to be one of them.

== Bibliography (in Italian) ==
- Elisabetta Marchetti Letta, Pontormo, Rosso Fiorentino, Scala, Firenze 1994. ISBN 88-8117-028-0
- Antonio Natali, Rosso Fiorentino, Silvana Editore, Milano 2006. ISBN 88-366-0631-8
