= Francesco d'Angelo =

Sculptor and engineer in Florence, Italy

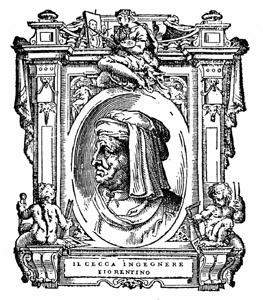
Picture of d'Angelo in Lives of the Artists

Francesco d'Angelo (1446–1488), also known as Il Cecca, was a sculptor and engineer in Florence, Italy. He is best known for his sculptures―often mechanical―carried in religious processions, theatrical machinery, and military devices. He was killed in battle in 1488 while accompanying the Florentine army and was buried in Florence at the Church of San Pier Scheraggio (later absorbed into the Uffizi Gallery).
