= San Fabiano, Prato =

Church building in Prato, Italy

Coordinates: 43°53′2.75″N 11°5′38.35″E

Chiesa di san Fabiano
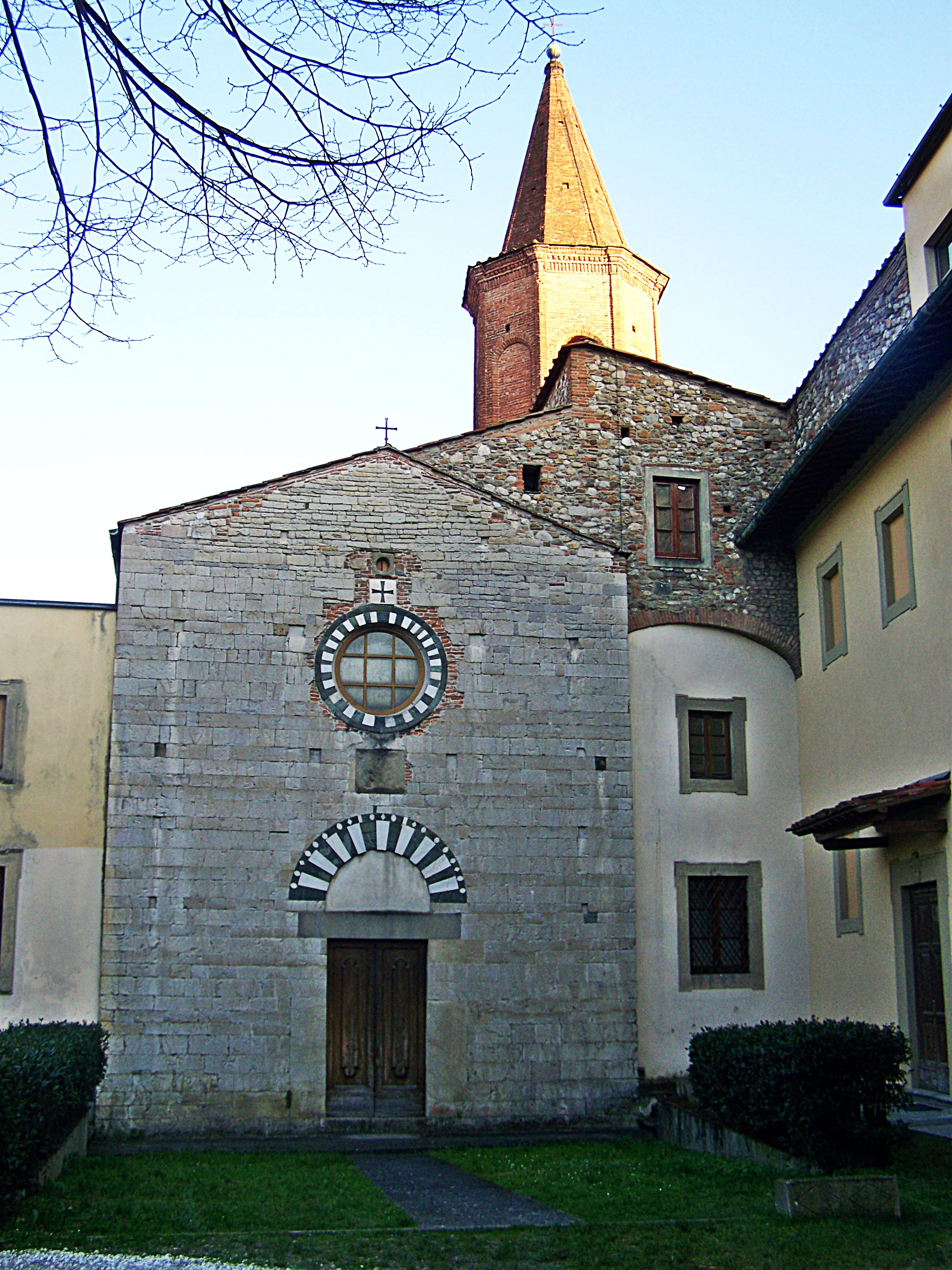
- The facade

Religion
- Affiliation: Roman Catholic

Location
- Location: Prato, Italy
- Interactive map of Chiesa di san Fabiano

Architecture
- Type: Church
- Style: Romanesque,

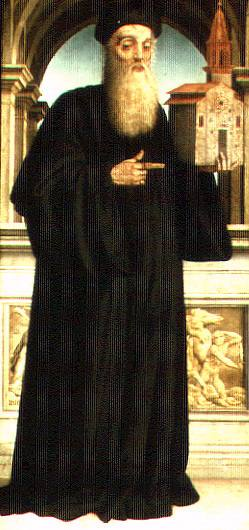
Baldo Magini with a model of the Church of San Fabiano (1522) by Niccolò Soggi

San Fabiano
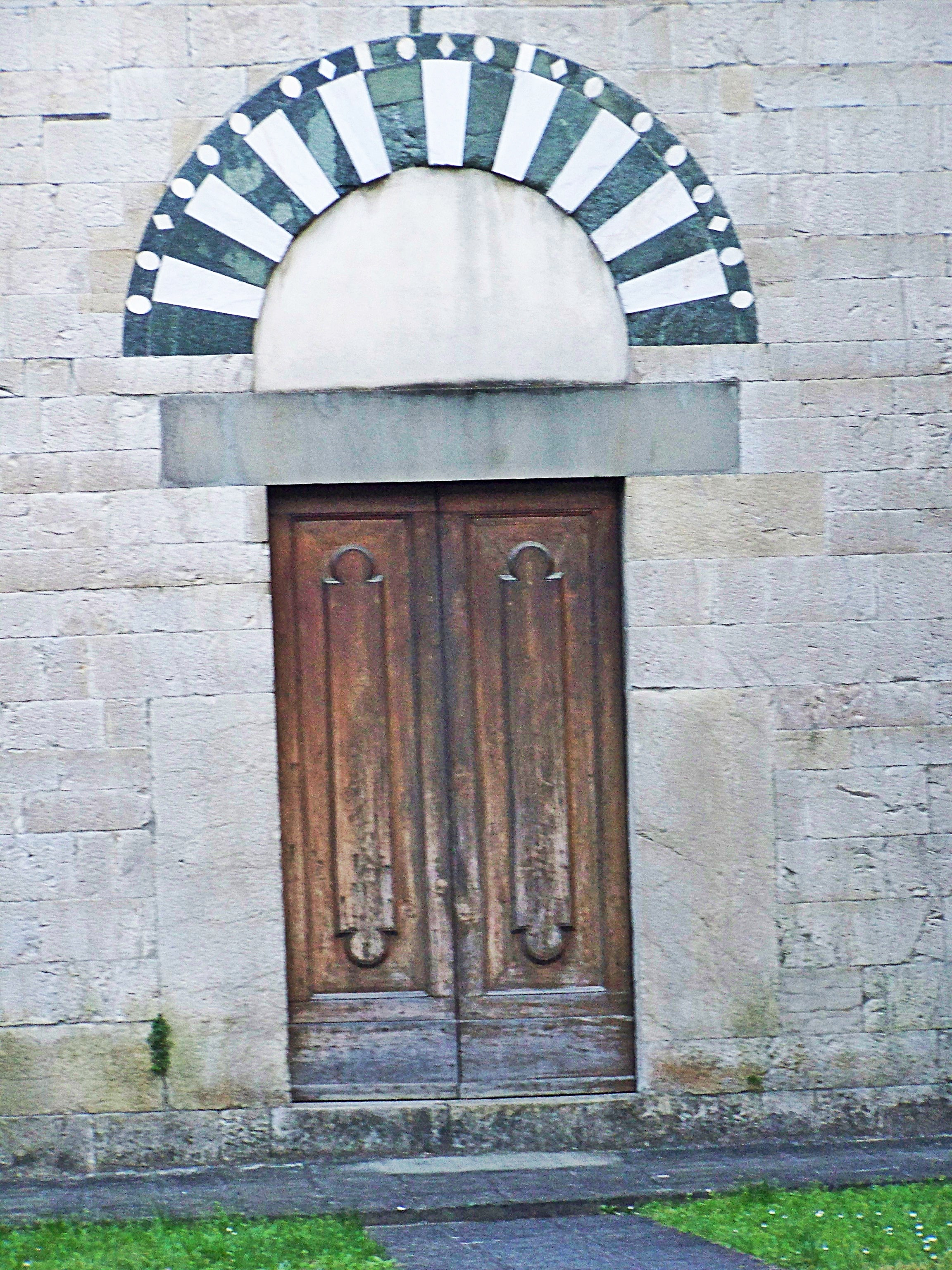
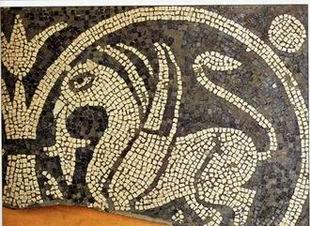

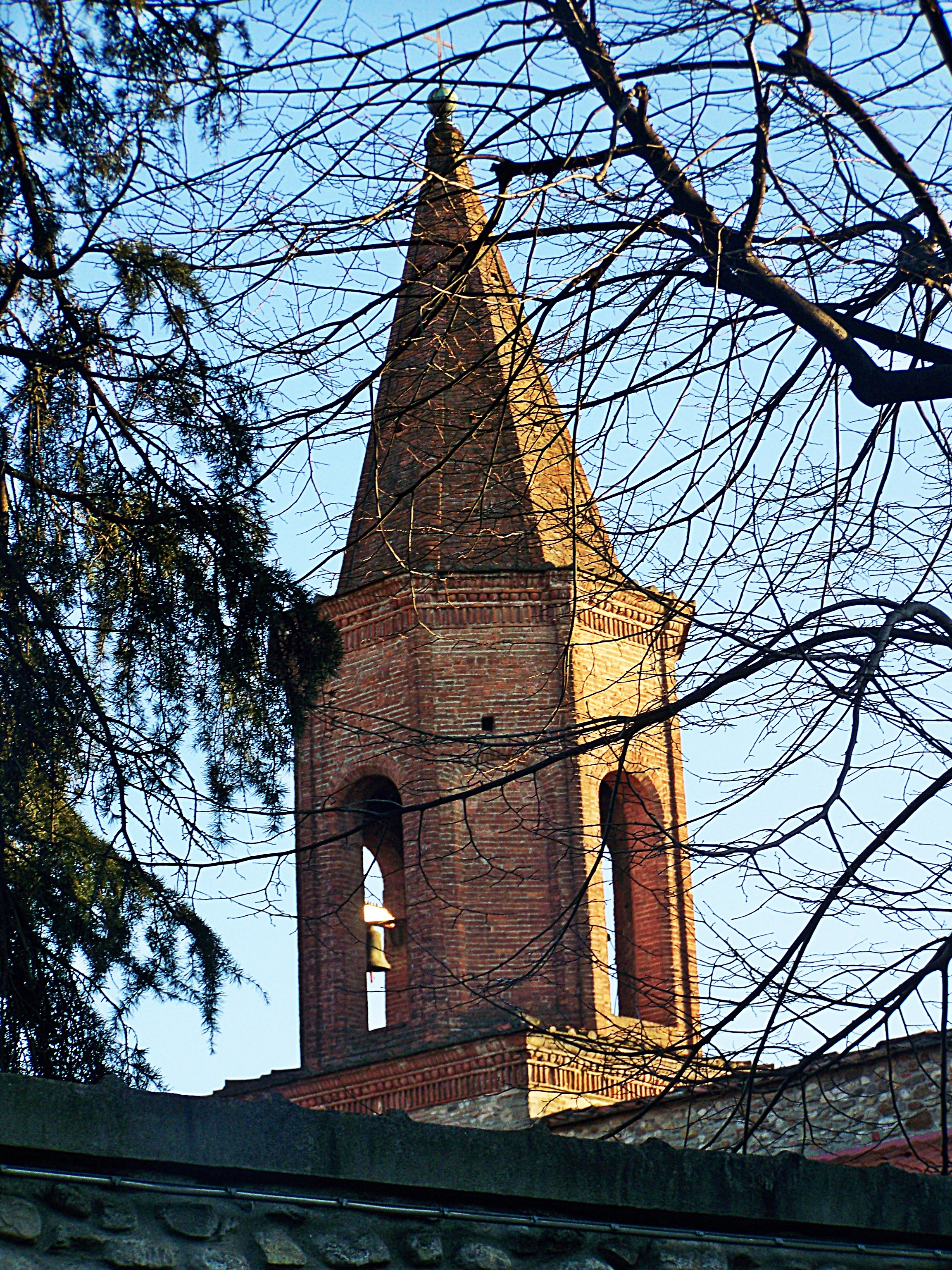

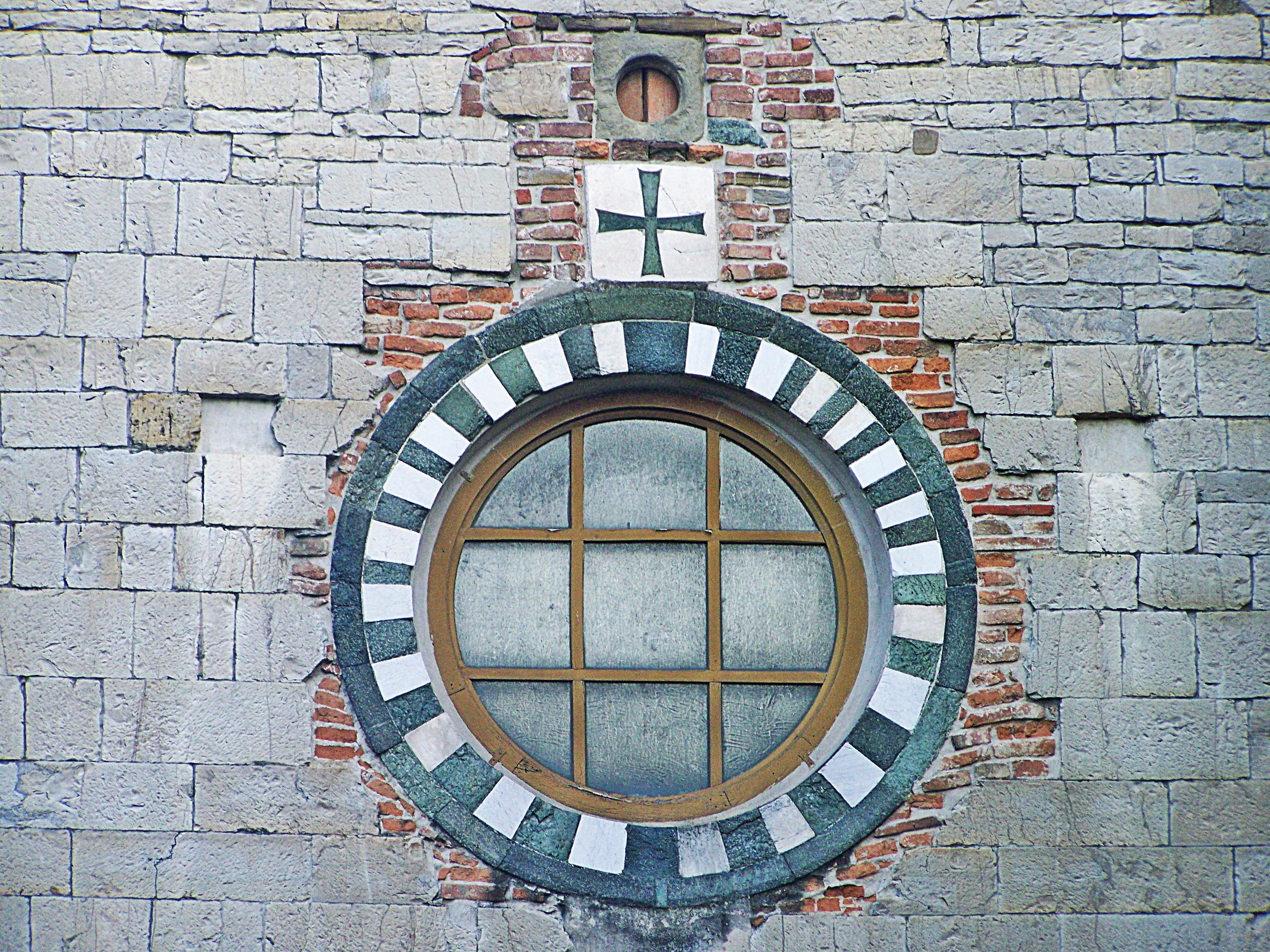

San Fabiano is a Romanesque-style, Roman Catholic church and abbey located at Via di Gherardo and Via del Seminario street in Prato, region of Tuscany, Italy. The early medieval structure is one of Prato's oldest churches.

== History ==
The church already was documented in 1082, and construction lasted into 12th century. Originally attached to a Benedictine monastery, it later passed to the Vallumbrosan Order.

The church is noted for the 11th century mosaic pavement, depicting panthers, sirens, griffins, and floral motifs, which were found during restoration of the church. The mosaic is made of light Alberese tiles and black marble. The mosaic images, like the siren, are believed to depict pagan symbols, which suggests that the church was built on a former pagan site.

In the 15th century or the beginning of the 16th century, the brick polygonal bell-tower was added to the church. In 1522, Niccolò Soggi painted the altarpiece Baldo Magini with a model of the Church of San Fabiano; this painting is now located in the Prato Cathedral.

The polychrome wooden Crucifix located behind the altar is also from the 16th century. Within the courtyard is a facade that has a white and green Prato marble archivolt portal.
