= Rocco Zoppo =

Italian painter

- Born: Giovan Maria di Bartolomeo Bacci di Belforte
- Died: 1508; Italy
- Education: Pietro Perugino
- Known for: Painting, Fresco
- Movement: Italian Renaissance

Rocco Zoppo, real name Giovan Maria di Bartolomeo Bacci di Belforte (floruit 1496–1508) was a Florentin painter, a pupil and collaborator of Pietro Perugino.

According to Giorgio Vasari in the Lives of the Most Excellent Painters, Sculptors, and Architects, Zoppo worked with Perugino on the Sistine Chapel in the Vatican. He was best known for his paintings of the Madonna and for his portraits.
