= Matteo dal Nasaro Veronese =

Italian sculptor

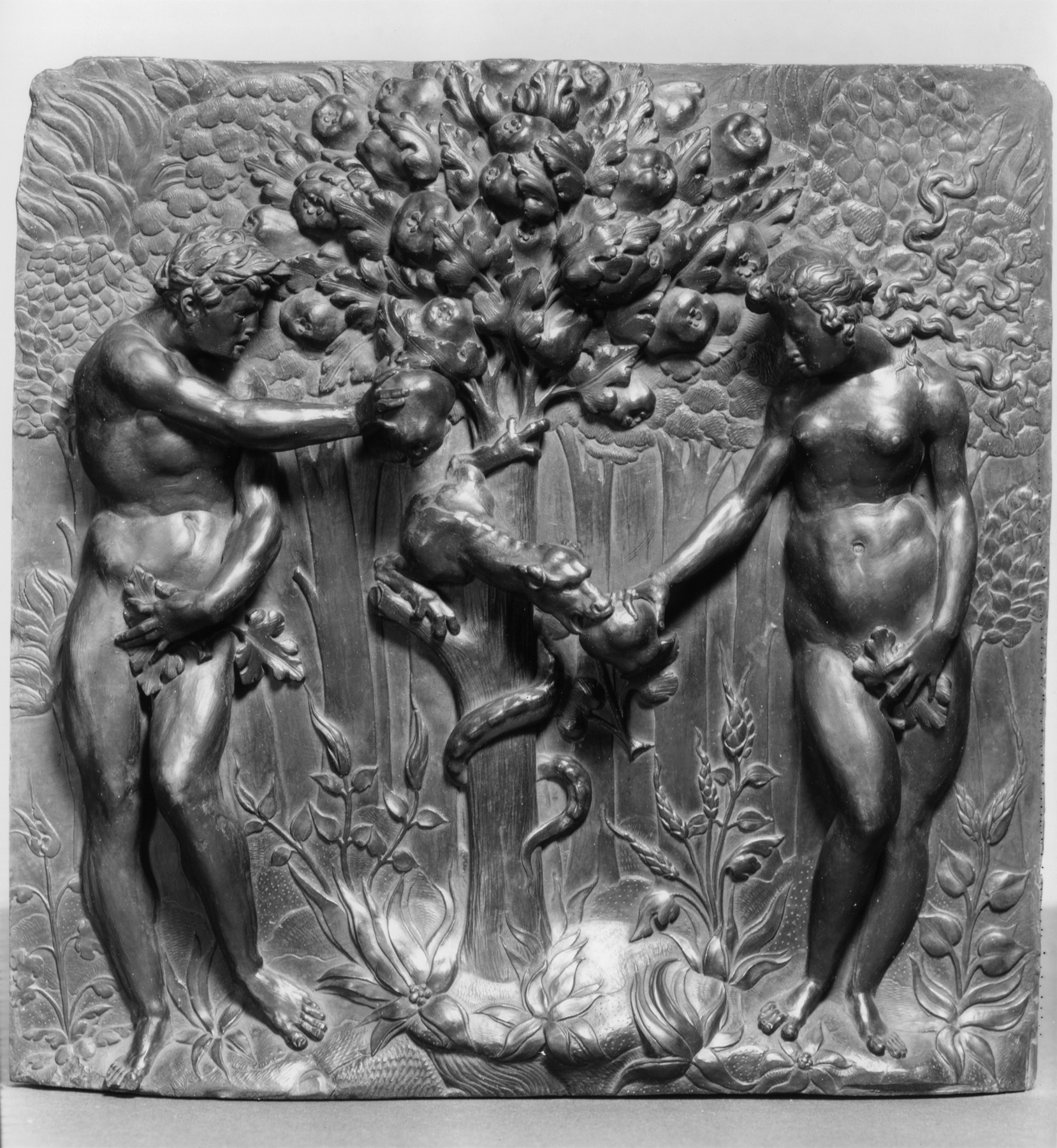
Panel with the Fall of Adam and Eve by Matteo dal Nasaro Veronese, Walters Art Museum, 1501

Matteo dal Nasaro Veronese (died c. 1548), also known as Matteo dal Nasaro of Verona, was an Italian sculptor.

He was born in Verona, Italy, but came to prominence in Paris. According to Giorgio Vasari in his Lives of the Most Excellent Painters, Sculptors, and Architects, Matteo dal Nasaro excelled in the production of portrait cameos.
