= Niccolò Soggi =

Italian painter

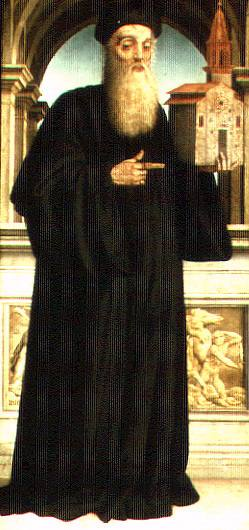
Baldo Magini with a model of the Church of San Fabiano, painting by Niccolò Soggi (1522), in the Prato Cathedral.

Niccolò Soggi (c. 1480 - 12 July 1552) was an Italian painter, born in Monte San Savino in the Province of Arezzo, Italy.

He was a pupil of Pietro Perugino, and was in Rome during the pontificate of Pope Leo X. Soggi then moved to Prato, where Baldo Magini was his principal patron. He eventually settled in Arezzo. Among his pupils was Papino della Pieve.
