= Paola Barocchi =

Italian art historian (1927–2016)

Paola Barocchi FBA (2 April 1927 in Florence – 25 May 2016 in Florence) was an Italian art historian, best remembered for her work in the fields of the history of modern art, art criticism, renaissance art, and mannerism. She notably published authoritative works on the lives of Rosso Fiorentino, Michelangelo, and Giorgio Vasari (with Rosanna Bettarini). A graduate of the University of Florence alongside Mario Salmi, she taught at the University of Salento and the Scuola Normale Superiore di Pisa. In 1991, she received a Feltrinelli Prize from the Accademia dei Lincei alongside Enrico Castelnuovo, with whom she would go on to undertake restoration work of the Camposanto Monumentale di Pisa. She was a member of the Accademia delle Arti del Disegno, the Accademia dei Lincei, and the Accademia di San Luca.

== Biography ==
A central figure in the Modern art history and art criticism, after studying at the Galileo State Classical High School, she graduated from the University of Florence in 1949 with Mario Salmi, discussing a thesis on Rosso Fiorentino, published in 1950 by the publisher Gismondi. Appointed assistant professor at the University of Florence in 1957, she obtained her teaching qualification in 1959, the year in which she was appointed to teach medieval and modern art history at the University of Lecce. She was awarded a professorship at the same university in 1966 and continued her academic career at the Scuola Normale Superiore di Pisa, where she taught from 1968 onwards. The first female full professor at this institution and its long-standing deputy director, she distinguished herself for her pioneering application of information technology to historical and artistic studies. In 1980, she founded the Center for the Automatic Processing of Historical and Artistic Data and Documents, which in 1991 was renamed the Center for IT Research for Cultural Heritage (CRiBeCu). Her work on the computerization of sources continued after her retirement in 2001 through the Memofonte Foundation, which she established in Florence and which is still active today. In the same Florentine building on Via de' Coverelli where she lived, she founded the publishing house S.P.E.S. (Studio per edizioni scelte) in 1974, which she closed of his own accord in 2014.

Her studies focused on the Renaissance and Mannerism. He made his debut in 1950 with a monograph on Rosso Fiorentino, reviewed by Roberto Longhi, before devoting himself to the study of Michelangelo, publishing the corpus of drawings from the Florentine collections, and Giorgio Vasari the painter. Many of his texts are considered fundamental to the study of art history and criticism, notably the three-volume Trattati d'arte del Cinquecento (Treatises on Art of the Sixteenth Century). Between Mannerism and Counter-Reformation (1960-1962), the critical edition in five volumes of Vasari's Life of Michelangelo (1962) and the critical edition in six volumes of Vasari's Lives, with Rosanna Bettarini(1966-1987). He also edited the publication of Michelangelo's correspondence and several volumes on Medici collecting.

Honorary Academician at the Accademia delle Arti del Disegno since 1974, in 1978 she was elected "Vice President of the Art History Class." In 1991, she was awarded the Antonio Feltrinelli Prize by the Accademia dei Lincei, together with Enrico Castelnuovo (art historian), her colleague at the Normale. He was a member of the Accademia di San Luca since 1993.
