= Properzia de' Rossi =

Italian sculptor (c. 1490–1530)

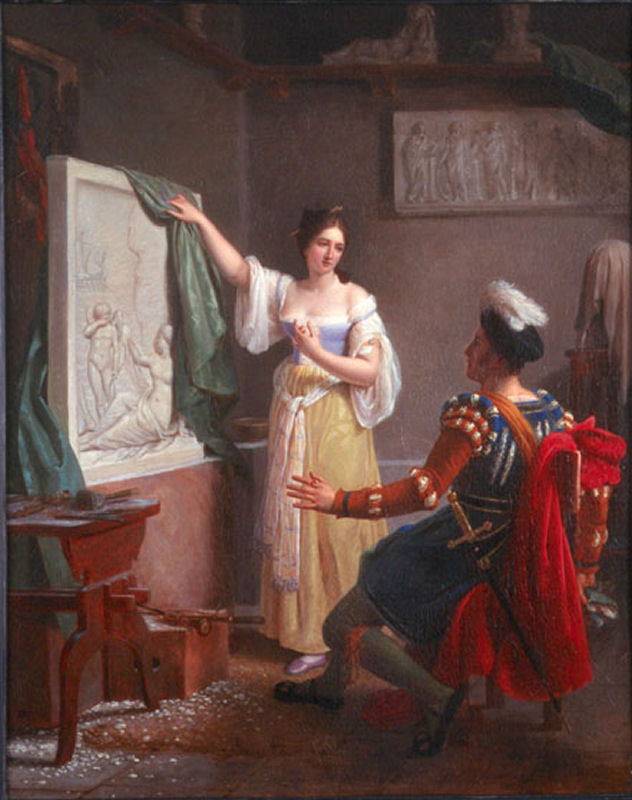
- Louis Ducis, Properzia de Rossi finishing her last bas-relief (1822, Musée de l'Évêché de Limoges)
- Born: c. 1490; Bologna
- Died: 1530; Bologna
- Resting place: Della Morte Hospital

Properzia de' Rossi (c. 1490 – 1530) was a female Italian Renaissance sculptor and one of only four women to receive a biography in Vasari's Lives of the Artists.

== Biography ==
Properzia de' Rossi was born in Bologna; she was the daughter of Giovanni Martino Rossi da Modena, a notary. Unusually for early modern female artists, she was not the daughter of an artist. She appears to have studied painting, music, dance, poetry, and classical literature. She is also said to have studied with a sculptor at the University of Bologna. Vasari stated she was expert in "household matters" as well as many sciences and played and sang "better than any other woman of her city." Undecided in her youth as to which outlet of self-expression she wanted to pursue, she found her direction when she tried her hand at sculpture, with some sources claiming that she created small but intricately detailed works of art on apricot, peach, and cherry stones. However, this may have been a fabrication invented by Vasari to explain how a woman could have learned the art of sculpture. The subject of these small "friezes" was often religious, with one of the most famous being a Passion of Christ with Apostles and Crucifixion in a peach stone. This carving has been identified as a component of a necklace located in the Palazzo Bonamini-Pepoli, Pesaro. Other attributed works include a carved cherry stone, located in the Uffizi, and a set of eleven carved peach stones inset in silver filigree, located in the Archaeological Museum at Bologna. Vasari also noted she copied in pen and ink drawings by Raphael. Vasari described her as married.

=== Major commissions ===
In 1525, de' Rossi was one of several artists brought in to work for the Cathedral of San Petronio in Bologna on a set of reliefs with scenes from the book of Genesis, begun by four artists in August 1524, including the painter Amico Aspertini. Vasari stated that de' Rossi asked to be considered for this commission and that the authorities requested an example of her work, so she executed the portrait bust of Conte Guido de' Pepoli in marble for his son Alessandro, to wide acclaim (Bologna, Palazzo Pepoli Campogrande).

Cathedral records show that she was paid to create three sibyls, two angels, and a "quadro" - probably a pair of bas-relief panels, including the panel Joseph and Potiphar's Wife now in the Museum of San Petronio in Bologna. In the scene, Joseph attempts to escape from the wife of an Egyptian officer. The skillfully executed musculature and classical dress of the figures reveal de' Rossi's knowledge of antiquity. Her style in this piece is in the "maniera moderna" of artists such as Giulio Romano, Michelangelo, Alfonso Lombardi, Correggio and Parmigianino. The subject matter of Joseph fleeing from his temptress was popular in the early days of the Counter-Reformation, as it conveyed the dangers of female immorality. The second bas-relief panel is believed to be the Visit of the Queen of Sheba to Solomon. Vasari wrote that de' Rossi was paid "a most beggarly price for her work," attributing this to her colleague Aspertini working to ruin her commissions and pay. Vasari stated that she never worked for the Cathedral again, which is supported by her absence from their records after 1526.

In 1526, she is recorded as executing an engraved marble piece, commissioned by Goro Geri, for the Church of Madonna del Baraccano in Bologna.

=== Legal issues ===
De' Rossi's life has been described as transgressive. In 1520, she was accused of vandalism of a private garden belonging to her neighbour, Francesco da Milano, a velvet merchant, along with Anton Galeazzo Malvasia, with whom she was noted as his "concubine". She was charged in 1525 of defacing the face of artist Vincenzo Miola together with painter Domenico Francia by throwing paint in his face and scratching his eyes; Amico Aspertini corroborated the accusation. In 1529 she is documented as an indigent in the Hospital di San Giobbe, where she was recovering from syphilis.

=== Later years ===
Vasari claimed in later life de' Rossi devoted herself to engraving to great acclaim. No works have been attributed to her. Vasari wrote that her fame spread throughout Italy until it reached the ears of the Pope. She died in the same week as Charles V's coronation by Clement VII in Bologna on 24 February 1530. Clement VII was told that de' Rossi was a "noble and elevated genius" and travelled to Bologna to meet her; however, she died before his arrival. She was buried in the Della Morte hospital as expressed in her will. Vasari stated that her fellow citizens "regarded her during her lifetime as one of the greatest miracles produced by nature in our days".

== De' Rossi in The Lives of the Most Excellent Painters, Sculptors, and Architects ==
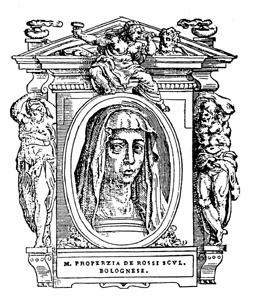
A supposed portrait of Properzia, from Vasari's Lives

Although many female artists are known to have worked during the Italian Renaissance, de' Rossi was the only woman to be included in Vasari's biographies. In her life, Vasari gives examples of ancient women from the Classical tradition who achieved extraordinary things, and contemporary female writers, and then states, "Nor have they been too proud to set themselves with their little hands, so tender and so white, as if to wrest from us the palm of supremacy, to manual labours, braving the roughness of marble and the unkindly chisels, in order to attain to their desire and thereby win fame", going on to describe de' Rossi's achievements.

Some scholars have seen Vasari's life as shaped only by derogatory assumptions about women, but it can be read in more complex ways, for instance, where de' Rossi's female body allegorises aspects of contemporary art making. Vasari does claim that de' Rossi was able to depict Joseph and Potiphar's wife so successfully because she was madly in love with a "handsome young man" who cared little for her, and that in carving this piece she was able to get over her passion. This description draws on contemporary notions of women controlled by their passions and by melancholia.

== Legacy ==
Gian Paolo Lomazzo wrote a life of de' Rossi, adding details to the tale around the Joseph and Potiphar's wife piece and comparing her to tragic women of antiquity such as Sappho. Felicia Hemans included the poem Properzia Rossi. in her collection, Records of Women (1828) where she focused on the artist's unrequited love through an ekphrasis based on Louis Ducas' painting of 1822. De' Rossi functioned for Hemans as a female artist who transcends the role of muse, liberating herself from traditional gender constraints through the act of self-creation. 1828 also saw the publication and performance of a play about Properzia's life by Paolo Costa, which also focuses on De Rossi's unrequited love, eventually leading to her death.

In 1830, the Accademia delli Belli Arti of Bologna celebrated De' Rossi among other early modern women artists, noting her unique role as a sculptor and defending her against Vasari's construction of her as a woman who couldn't cope with the extremes of unrequited passion.

== Sources ==
- Chadwick, Whitney, Women, Art, and Society, Thames and Hudson, London, 1990
- Heller, Nancy G. Women Artists: An Illustrated History.New York: Abbeville Press, 1997.
- Harris, Anne Sutherland and Linda Nochlin, Women Artists: 1550–1950, Los Angeles County Museum of Art, Knopf, New York, 1976
- Jacobs, Frederika. The Construction of a Life: Madonna Properzia De' Rossi 'Scultrice Bolognese', Word and Image, 1993, pp. 122–32.
- Vasari, Giorgio. The Life of Madonna Properzia de' Rossi, in The Lives of the Artists (1568), trans. J. and P. Bondanella, Oxford: Oxford University Press, 1991, pp. 339–44.
- Original text from 1568 edition with illustration of Properzia de' Rossi by Giorgio Vasari on Italian Wikisource
- Griselda Pollock, et al. "Women and art history." Grove Art Online. Oxford Art Online. Oxford University Press 2003
