= Lucrezia Quistelli della Mirandola =

Italian painter

Lucrezia Quistelli
- Born: 1541; Florence, Italy
- Died: 1594 (aged 52–53)
- Known for: Painting
- Spouse: Count Clemente Pietra

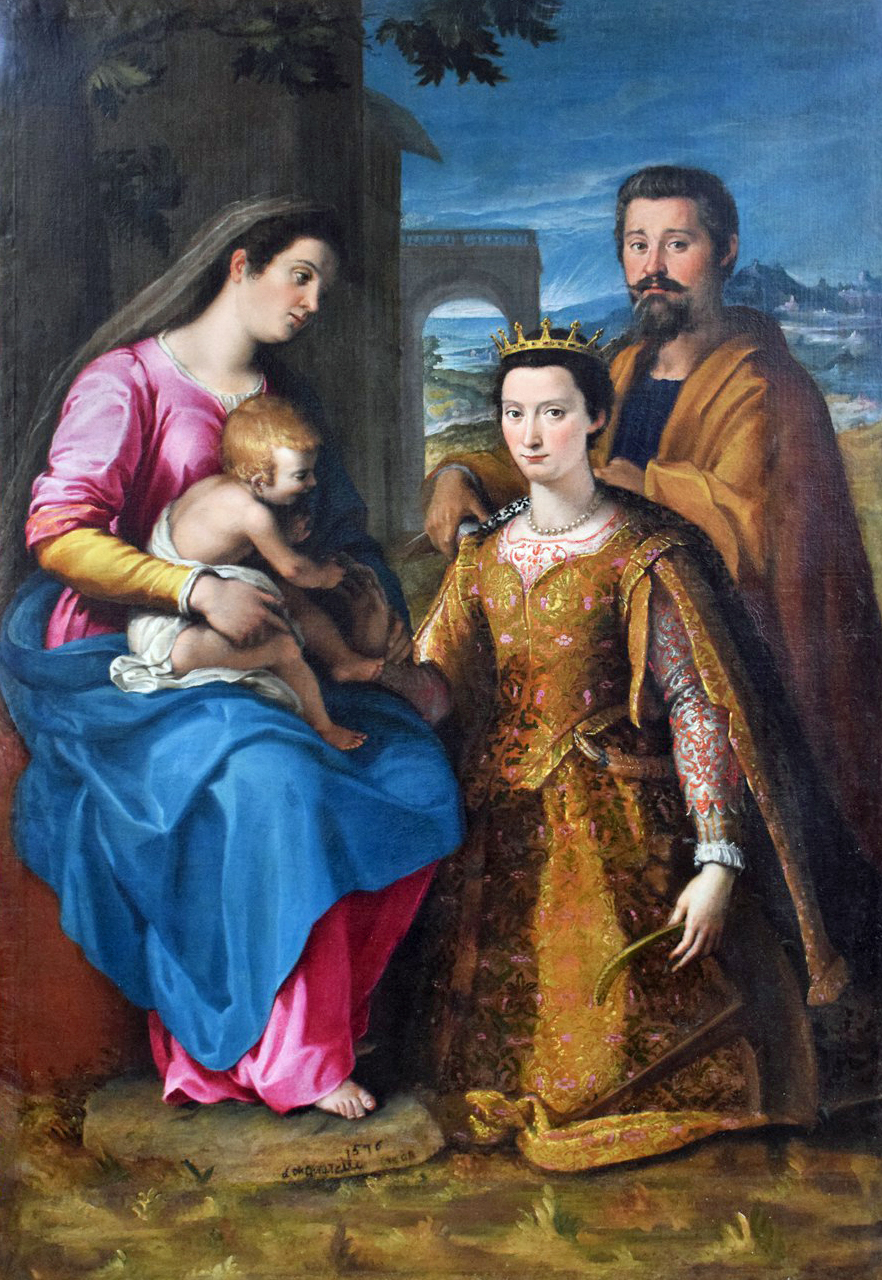
Mystical Marriage of Saint Catherine by Lucrezia Quistelli, 1576

Lucrezia Quistelli della Mirandola (1541–1594) was an Italian painter.

== Biography ==
Lucrezia Quistelli was born on October 19, 1538, in Florence, Italy. Quistelli was baptized in 1541. She is the daughter of Alfonso Quistelli and Giulia Santi. She was known for her paintings and studied under Alessandro Allori. Quistelli married Count Clemente Pietra and they had eight children, six daughters and two sons. She died in 1594, in Florence.

== Lucrezia's Family ==
=== The Quistelli Family & Creating Connections ===
==== Alfonso Quistelli ====
Lucrezia's father, Alfonso Quistelli, began to participate in literary patronage in hopes of elevating the Quistelli's social status in Florence. Through the participation of the literary patronage, he became well acquainted with Benedetto Varchi. They became sufficiently close that Varchi dedicated a pastoral sonnet to Alfonso, a sonnet to his wife Giulia Santi, in memoriam of the loss of Cosmi, Lucrezia's younger brother. Varchi knew Alessandro Allori and Agnolo Bronzino. This connection offers the strongest indication of Allori becoming Lucrezia's tutor.

===== Giulia Santi =====
Lucrezia’s mother was Giulia di Sigismondo Santi (from Ferrera), daughter of Lucrezia Rabbia and Sigismondo Santi. Santi's family was made of humanists and courtiers. Lucrezia was named after her grandmother.

Lucrezia's mother, Giulia Santi was married once before she married Alfonso Quistelli. She was married to Alberto II Pio of Savoy, who was killed. She was widowed in 1532, then remarried to Alfonso Quistelli the following year. Following the death of Santi's father, her family worked in the households of Medici dukes. Alfonso Quistelli worked with Alessandro de'Medici. Alessandro de'Medici was the Duke of Florence and the fiscal auditor, Quistelli was given a position on the Duke's primary legal counsel.

== Education ==
The Quistellis' connection with famous artists and writers shaped Lucrezia’s education. In Lucrezia’s time in Florence, children of noblemen received a humanist education coupled with tutoring under Alessandro Allori, and other successful artists. Lucrezia had a possible academic relationship with her older brothers’ tutor, the Latinist Dionigi Lippi. Lippi wrote a letter to Lucrezia, praising her faith and purity. Aside from the instruction of Bronzino, Allori learned about literature from Silvano Razzi, a Camaldolese writer and priest who worked alongside Giorgio Vasari and was friends with Varchi

== Artistic Inspiration ==
=== Upbringing ===
It is possible that Lucrezia’s artistic inspirations are drawn from her upbringing and setting. Alfonso owned the painting by Jacopo Pontormo, Madonna with Child and Saints. Lucrezia was baptized at the San Procolo church. The San Procolo church had altarpieces created by famous artists such as Filippino Lippi, Lorenzo Monaco, and Ambrogio Lorenzetti. The Capponi Chapel, a Santa Felicita church that was once in close proximity to her, carried Pontormo’s artworks. The Church of San Barnaba, her family’s burial place and where her sister’s and daughter’s vow took place, carried Sandro Botticelli’s San Barnaba Altarpiece and Annunciation. Lucrezia’s Florence upbringing and faith means she possibly acknowledged and was inspired by Suor Plautilla Nelli, the first female artist in Florence. Nelli was a nun and a painter, her artwork was owned by many men in Florence, and she taught women in her art studio. Vasari also mentions Nelli in “the Lives of the Artists.”

== Marriage & Motherhood ==
In 1568, Pietra and Quistelli rented Florence’s Palazzo Pandolfini from the Salvati family. It was near the San Barnaba Church where Quistelli’s family is buried. Quistelli paid the bills and rent as well as managed some of Salvati's affairs.

She continued after the death of Clemente Pietra. Count Clemente was stabbed with a poison knife on February 9, 1574, and died on February 13, 1574. An author-less poem in Guiliano de’ Ricci’s Cronica details the assassination and the sorrow of Lucrezia. With the help of servants, she took care of her eight children. Her connections and late husband’s feudal ties allowed her children to marry into royalty, status, or lead monastic lifestyles.

== Mystical Marriage of Saint Catherine ==
The painting Mythical Marriage of Saint Catherine is the only surviving artwork of Lucrezia Quistelli. This is an altarpiece painting "The Mystical Marriage of Saint Catherine", an oil-on-canvas painting measuring 180x120 cm (c. 1576). This can be found at the Church of Santa Maria e San Pietro in Silvano Pietra.

This artwork was discovered as her painting due to the restoration process of cleaning. The painting was found covered in a thick layer of dirt and it was actively degrading. Experts from Gabbantichità Antiquariato Modernariato Restauri restored and cleaned this painting in 2015, discovering her signature L. Quistelli.

== Attributed Artworks ==
Lucrezia Quistelli did not create art for money, however, there are some artworks that could possibly be hers. This is because of her training under Alessandro Allori.

Some attributed artworks are:

The Flagellation of Christ, oil on panel, c.1570-80, Florence San Barnaba

Lamentation over the Dead Christ, oil on lead alloy c.1560, 23x20 cm, London: The Samuel Courtauld Trust, The Courtauld Gallery.

Portrait of a Gentleman, Museo de Arte de Sāo Paulo

== Artistic Legacy ==
Vasari’s inclusion of Quistelli is found in his Life of Properzia de’ Rossi, along with fellow women artists Sophonisba Anguissola and Plautilla Nelli. She is also mentioned in Girolamo Tiraboschi’s 1785 treatise, Notizie de’Pittori, Scultori, Incisori, e Architetti. Tiraboschi laments the fact that no other news of her work has survived other than Vasari’s short mention of her. However, one surviving altarpiece of hers can be found at the Church of Santa Maria e San Pietro in Silvano Pietra, "The Mystical Marriage of Saint Catherine", an oil-on-canvas painting measuring 180x120 cm (c. 1576). A chapter on Lucrezia Quistelli, authored by Sheila Barker, will be in the forthcoming book, Women Artists in Early Modern Italy: Careers, Fame, and Collectors [Brepols, May 2016].
