= Anna Maria Brizio =

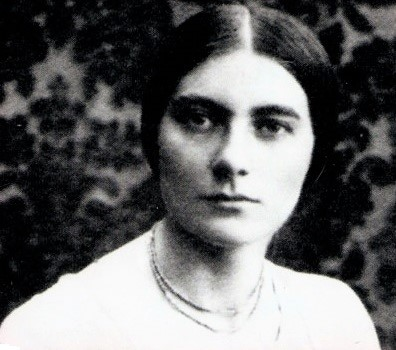
Anna Maria Brizio

Anna Maria Brizio (1902-1982) was professor of art history at the University of Milan, a member of the Commissione Vinciana and an authority on the work of Leonardo da Vinci.

== Selected publications ==
=== Italian ===
- Per il quarto centenario dalla nascita di Paolo Caliari detto Paolo Veronese. Note per una definizione critica dello stile di Paolo Veronese, in «L'arte. Rivista bimestrale di storia dell'arte medioevale e moderna», 31 (1928), fasc. 1
- Un'opera giovanile del Botticelli, in «L'arte. Rivista bimestrale di storia dell'arte medioevale e moderna», marzo 1933, fasc. 2, pp. 108–119
- Per il quinto centenario Verrocchiesco (1435-1935), in «Emporium», dicembre 1935, pp. 293–303
- Vercelli. Catalogo delle cose d'arte e d'antichità d'Italia, Roma 1935
- Ottocento, Novecento, Unione tipografico-editrice torinese, Torino 1939 (costituisce il vol. 6 della Storia dell'arte classica e italiana; ristampato a più riprese fino al 1962)
- Nota bibliografica degli studi italiani recenti su argomenti di pittura spagnola e italo-spagnola, in Italia e Spagna. Saggi sui rapporti storici, filosofici ed artistici tra le due civiltà, a cura dell'Istituto Nazionale per le relazioni culturali con l'estero, Le Monnier, Firenze, 1941
- La pittura in Piemonte dall'età romanica al Cinquecento, G.B. Paravia, Torino 1942
- Vite scelte di Giorgio Vasari, a cura di Anna Maria Brizio, Unione tipografico-editrice torinese, Torino 1948 (e successive ristampe, fino al 1996)
- Scritti scelti di Leonardo da Vinci, a cura di Anna Maria Brizio, Unione tipografico-editrice torinese, Torino 1952 (e successive ristampe, fino al 2000)
- Correlazioni e rispondenze tra fogli del Codice atlantico e fogli dell'anatomia B e dei codici A e C su l'occhio, la prospettiva, le piramidi radiose e le ombre, in «Raccolta Vinciana», fasc. 17 (1954), pp. 82–89
- Il Trattato della pittura di Leonardo, De Luca, Roma 1956
- I manoscritti di Leonardo da Vinci nella Biblioteca nacional di Madrid, Akademiai Kiado, Budapest 19..!, pp. 725–734
- Disegni di Carlo Francesco Nuvolone alla Biblioteca Ambrosiana, A. Nicola, Milano - Varese 1959
- Manierismo. Rinascimento, in «Bollettino del Centro internazionale di studi d'architettura A. Palladio», 9 (1967), pp. 219–226
- Rassegna degli studi vinciani dal 1952 al 1968, in [?], 1968, pp. 107–120
- Bramante e Leonardo alla corte di Ludovico il Moro, De Luca Editore, 1970
- Il Codice di Leonardo da Vinci nella Biblioteca Trivulziana di Milano. Trascrizione diplomatica e critica, Giunti-Barbèra, Firenze 1980
- Attualità leonardiane, in «L'Almanacco italiano», v. 81 (1981) e v. 82 (1982).

=== English ===
- Leonardo the Scientist. McGraw-Hill, New York, 1980. (With Carlo Zammattio and Augusto Marinoni) ISBN 0070727236
