= Rosanna Bettarini =

Italian philologist (1938–2012)

Rosanna Bettarini (30 July 1938, in Florence – 26 December 2012, in Florence) was an Italian philologist, best known for her critical editions on the works of Giorgio Vasari (with Paola Barocchi), Dante da Maiano, Jacopone da Todi, Eugenio Montale (with Gianfranco Contini), and Petrarch. She taught at the University of Florence, was a member of the Accademia della Crusca and the Accademia dei Lincei, and was president of the Viareggio Prize.

== Biography ==
A professor at the University of Florence, she was a member of the Accademia della Crusca and the Accademia Nazionale dei Lincei, as well as president of the Viareggio Prize. As a philologist, she is best remembered for her critical editions of Giorgio Vasari Lives of the Most Excellent Painters, Sculptors, and Architects, in the 1550 and 1568 editions, with commentary by Paola Barocchi (6 volumes, Florence, Sansoni, 1966-87), Dante da Maiano (Florence, Le Monnier, 1969), Jacopone da Todi's Laudario urbinate (Florence, Sansoni, 1969), Eugenio Montale's L'opera in versi (Turin, Einaudi, 1980, in collaboration with his teacher Gianfranco Contini), Petrarch Canzoniere (Turin, Einaudi, 2005). Between 1991 and 1996, he also published Montale's poems from the Diario postumo (Posthumous Diary) for Mondadori, whose attribution was contested by Dante Isella.
