= Patricia Rubin =

American art historian

Patricia Lee Rubin is an American art historian and a scholar of Italian Renaissance art.

== Early life and education ==
Rubin received her BA from Yale University in 1975, where she was elected to Phi Beta Kappa. She received her MA from the Courtauld Institute of Art, University of London, in 1978, and her Ph.D. from Harvard University in 1986.

== Career ==
Rubin was deputy director at the Courtauld Institute of Art. From 2009 - 2017 she was the Judy and Michael Steinhardt Director at the Institute of Fine Arts, New York University.

== Selected publications ==
- Giorgio Vasari. Art and history. Yale University Press, 1995. (won the Eric Mitchell Prize)
- Images and identity in fifteenth-century Florence. Yale University Press, 2007.
- Seen from Behind: Perspectives on the Male Body and Renaissance Art, Yale University Press, 2018.
