= Giovanni Antonio Lappoli =

Italian painter

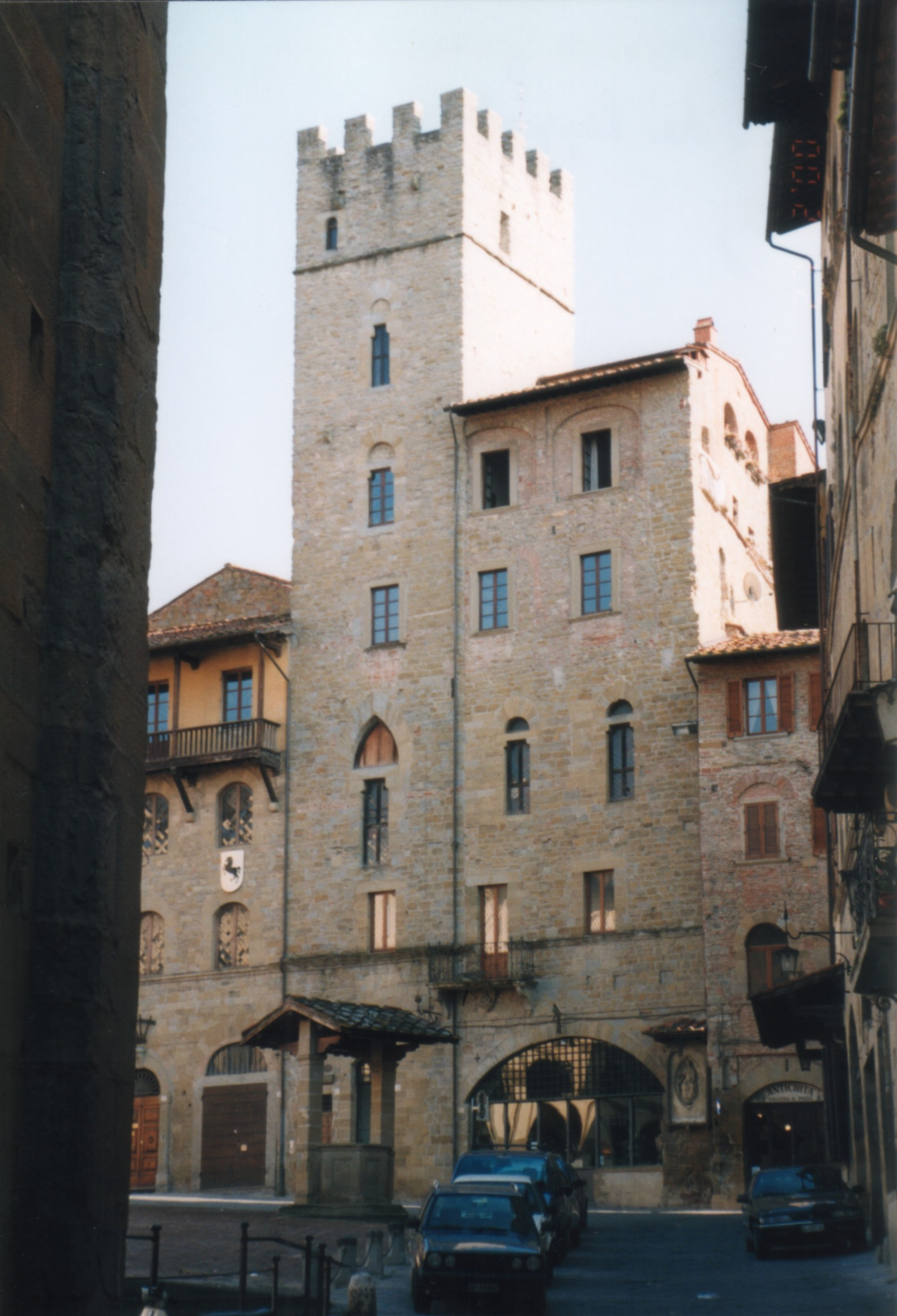
- Arezzo Casa dei Lappoli
- Born: 1492; Arezzo
- Died: 1552 (aged 59–60)
- Education: Domenico Pecori, Pontormo
- Known for: Painting
- Movement: Mannerism

Giovanni Antonio Lappoli (1492–1552) was a Tuscan painter from Arezzo who painted in a Mannerist style.

He was the son of the painter Matteo Lappoli. Originally trained with Domenico Pecori, but later assisted Pontormo in 1514. In 1524–7, he worked with Perin del Vaga in Rome. He became acquainted with both Parmigianino and Rosso Fiorentino. In 1524, Lappoli executed some frescoes, based on cartoons the latter had provided him, for a Visitation for Badia di Sante Fiore e Lucilla in 1524, an Adoration of the Magi for the church of San Francisco. In Rome, he was patronized by Clement VII, but he fled back to Arezzo with the Sack of Rome in 1527. He painted an Allegory of Original Sin in Montepulciano (1545). He is one of the artists featured in the Vite by fellow Arrezan Giorgio Vasari.
