= Matteo Lappoli =

Italian painter

Matteo Lappoli (1450–1504) was an Italian painter of the Renaissance period. He was born at Arezzo. He studied under Fra Bartolommeo. The greater part of his paintings have perished. There are still at Arezzo, in the refectory of the Bernardines, a St. Bernard, and for the church of Santa Maria, a St. Sebastian. His son, Giovanni Antonio Lappoli, was also a painter.
