= Teutsche Academie =

Comprehensive dictionary of art by Sandrart published in the late 17th-century

The German Academy of the Noble Arts of Architecture, Sculpture and Painting, or Teutsche Academie, refers to a comprehensive dictionary of art by Joachim von Sandrart published in the late 17th century. The first version was published in 1675 and it included a compilation of artist biographies that were later accompanied by illustrations by Richard Collin for a 1683 Latin edition by Christianus Rhodius. The list of portrait illustrations follows and is in page order. Most of the biographies were translated into German from earlier work by Karel van Mander and Cornelis de Bie, but Sandrart had travelled extensively in Europe and added many original biographies of German-born artists to his list. The illustrated portraits of artists born before his time were mostly based on 17th-century engravings by Hieronymus Cock and Jan Meyssens, many of which had also been re-published in De Bie's Het Gulden Cabinet.

Image	Name	Publication	Page
	Cimabue	Teutsche Academie, 1675	57
	Agnolo Gaddi	Teutsche Academie, 1675	64
	Gaddo Gaddi	Teutsche Academie, 1675	64
	Giotto	Teutsche Academie, 1675	60
	Simone Martini	Teutsche Academie, 1675	64
	Stefano di Giovanni	Teutsche Academie, 1675	62
	Taddeo Gaddi	Teutsche Academie, 1675	64
	Fra Angelico	Teutsche Academie, 1675	68
	Lippo Fiorentino	Teutsche Academie, 1675	67
	Petrarch	Teutsche Academie, 1675	52
	Laura	Teutsche Academie, 1675	52
	Paracelsus	Teutsche Academie, 1675	52
	Leon Battista Alberti	Teutsche Academie, 1675	68
	Jacopo Bellini	Teutsche Academie, 1675	88
	Donato Bramante	Teutsche Academie, 1675	89
	Leonardo da Vinci	Teutsche Academie, 1675	82
	Giorgione	Teutsche Academie, 1675	90
	Andrea Mantegna	Teutsche Academie, 1675	77
	Pietro Perugino	Teutsche Academie, 1675	81
	Piero di Cosimo	Teutsche Academie, 1675	107
	Mino da Fiesole	Teutsche Academie, 1675	68
	Properzia de' Rossi	Teutsche Academie, 1675	203
	Giuliano da Sangallo	Teutsche Academie, 1675	86
	Domenico Puligo	Teutsche Academie, 1675	86
	Andrea da Fiesole	Teutsche Academie, 1675	86
	Antonio da Correggio	Teutsche Academie, 1675	91
	Rosso Fiorentino	Teutsche Academie, 1675	106
	Gianfrancesco Penni	Teutsche Academie, 1675	99
	Polidoro da Caravaggio	Teutsche Academie, 1675	104
	Raphael	Teutsche Academie, 1675	92
	Andrea del Sarto	Teutsche Academie, 1675	102
	Parmigianino	Teutsche Academie, 1675	109
	Pontormo	Teutsche Academie, 1675	124
	Giulio Romano	Teutsche Academie, 1675	113
	Giovanni Francesco Rustici	Teutsche Academie, 1675	128
	Perino del Vaga	Teutsche Academie, 1675	118
	Giovanni da Udine	Teutsche Academie, 1675	122
	Baccio Bandinelli	Teutsche Academie, 1675	131
	Michelangelo	Teutsche Academie, 1675	146
	Francesco Primaticcio	Teutsche Academie, 1675	157
	Francesco de' Rossi (Il Salviati)	Teutsche Academie, 1675	137
	Taddeo Zuccari	Teutsche Academie, 1675	181
	Marcantonio Raimondi	Teutsche Academie, 1675	204
	Benedetto Caliari	Teutsche Academie, 1675	171
	Marietta Robusti	Teutsche Academie, 1675	170
	Tintoretto	Teutsche Academie, 1675	167
	Titian	Teutsche Academie, 1675	158
	Jacopo Bassano	Teutsche Academie, 1675	176
	Annibale Carracci	Teutsche Academie, 1675	186
	Giovanni Lanfranco	Teutsche Academie, 1675	198
	Giorgio Vasari	Teutsche Academie, 1675	177
	Giuseppe Cesari	Teutsche Academie, 1675	184
	Vincentius Justinianus	Teutsche Academie, 1675	196
	Guercino	Teutsche Academie, 1675	198
	Gian Lorenzo Bernini	Teutsche Academie, 1675	199
	Pietro da Cortona	Teutsche Academie, 1675	200
	Pietro Testa	Teutsche Academie, 1675	210
	Higiemon	Teutsche Academie, 1675	200
	Hubert van Eyck	Teutsche Academie, 1675	213
	Jan van Eyck	Teutsche Academie, 1675	213
	Martin Schongauer	Teutsche Academie, 1675	216
	Michael Wolgemut	Teutsche Academie, 1675	218
	David von Krafft	Teutsche Academie, 1675	220
	Peter Vischer	Teutsche Academie, 1675	230
	Albrecht Altdorfer	Teutsche Academie, 1675	231
	Hans Burgkmair	Teutsche Academie, 1675	232
	Lucas Cranach the Elder	Teutsche Academie, 1675	231
	Albrecht Dürer	Teutsche Academie, 1675	216
	Hans von Kulmbach	Teutsche Academie, 1675	232
	Christoph Amberger	Teutsche Academie, 1675	235
	Hans Sebald Beham	Teutsche Academie, 1675	233
	Barthel Beham	Teutsche Academie, 1675	233
	Jacob Binck	Teutsche Academie, 1675	234
	Matthias Grünewald	Teutsche Academie, 1675	237
	Georg Pencz	Teutsche Academie, 1675	233
	Hans Holbein the Elder	Teutsche Academie, 1675	249
	Sigismund Holbein	Teutsche Academie, 1675	249
	Hans Holbein the Younger	Teutsche Academie, 1675	249
	Niklaus Manuel	Teutsche Academie, 1675	253
	Hans Konrad Gyger	Teutsche Academie, 1675	254
	Conrad Meyer	Teutsche Academie, 1675	255
	Dietrich Meyer	Teutsche Academie, 1675	255
	Jos Murer	Teutsche Academie, 1675	253
	Tobias Stimmer	Teutsche Academie, 1675	254
	Hans Bocksberger	Teutsche Academie, 1675	260
	Frans Floris	Teutsche Academie, 1675	262
	Maarten van Heemskerck	Teutsche Academie, 1675	274
	Willem Key	Teutsche Academie, 1675	264
	Christoph Schwarz	Teutsche Academie, 1675	263
	Pieter Bruegel the Elder	Teutsche Academie, 1675	259
	Hans von Aachen	Teutsche Academie, 1675	286
	Joseph Heintz the Elder	Teutsche Academie, 1675	286
	Bartholomeus Spranger	Teutsche Academie, 1675	279
	Joos van Winghe	Teutsche Academie, 1675	280
	Giambologna	Teutsche Academie, 1675	278
	Abraham Bloemaert	Teutsche Academie, 1675	362
	Adam Elsheimer	Teutsche Academie, 1675	294
	Adam van Noort	Teutsche Academie, 1675	288
	Guido Reni	Teutsche Academie, 1675	193
	Peter Paul Rubens	Teutsche Academie, 1675	290
	Otto van Veen	Teutsche Academie, 1675	288
	Orazio Gentileschi	Teutsche Academie, 1675	298
	Artemisia Gentileschi	Teutsche Academie, 1675	204
	Joris Hoefnagel	Teutsche Academie, 1675	299
	Roelant Savery	Teutsche Academie, 1675	305
	Hendrik van Steenwijk II	Teutsche Academie, 1675	299
	Simon Vouet	Teutsche Academie, 1675	367
	Adriaen Brouwer	Teutsche Academie, 1675	305
	Anthony van Dyck	Teutsche Academie, 1675	304
	Michiel Jansz. van Mierevelt	Teutsche Academie, 1675	302
	Cornelius van Poelenburgh	Teutsche Academie, 1675	305
	Wendel Dietterlin	Teutsche Academie, 1675	310
	Johann Ulrich Mayr	Teutsche Academie, 1675	329
	Susanna Mayr	Teutsche Academie, 1675	328
	François Duquesnoy	Teutsche Academie, 1675	348
	Pieter van Laer	Teutsche Academie, 1675	311
	Jan Dirksz Both	Teutsche Academie, 1675	312
	Claude Lorrain	Teutsche Academie, 1675	331
	Nicolas Poussin	Teutsche Academie, 1675	367
	Daniel Seghers	Teutsche Academie, 1675	313
	Karel Škréta	Teutsche Academie, 1675	327
	Michel Leblond	Teutsche Academie, 1675	358
	Georg Petel	Teutsche Academie, 1675	342
	Rembrandt	Teutsche Academie, 1675	326
	Aegidius Sadeler	Teutsche Academie, 1675	355
	Stefano della Bella	Teutsche Academie, 1675	210
	Pieter de Jode II	Teutsche Academie, 1675	363
	Lucas Kilian	Teutsche Academie, 1675	364
	Paulus Pontius	Teutsche Academie, 1675	360
	Artus Quellinus	Teutsche Academie, 1675	351
	Lucas Vorsterman	Teutsche Academie, 1675	358
	Wenzel Jamnitzer	Teutsche Academie, 1675	375
	David Klöcker	Teutsche Academie, 1675	334
	Matthaeus Merian the Younger	Teutsche Academie, 1675	324
	Johann Heinrich Schönfeld	Teutsche Academie, 1675	327
	Anna Maria van Schurman	Teutsche Academie, 1675	375
	Thomas Blanchet	Teutsche Academie, Vol. III, 1675	70
	Johann Jakob Thurneysen	Teutsche Academie, Vol. III, 1675	351
	Richard Collin	Teutsche Academie, 1675	363
	Benjamin von Block	Teutsche Academie, Vol. III, 1675	74
	Johann Rudolf Werdmüller	Teutsche Academie, Vol. III, 1675	75
	Melchior Barthel	Teutsche Academie, 1675	374

== Sources ==
- Teutscher Academie der Edlen Bau, Bild- und Mahlerey-Künste (1675–80)
