= Sandrart =

Sandrart may refer to:

== People ==
- Esther Barbara von Sandrart (1651–1733), German art collector
- Jacob von Sandrart (1630–1708), a German engraver.
- Joachim von Sandrart (1606–1688), a German Baroque art-historian and painter.
- Johann von Sandrart (1610–1679), painter and etcher in Frankfort, Rome und Amsterdam.
- Karl Gustav von Sandrart (1817–1898), Prussian general in the Franco-Prussian War of 1870.
- Susanne Maria von Sandrart (1658–1716), a German artist and engraver.
