= Giovanni Gaddi (priest) =

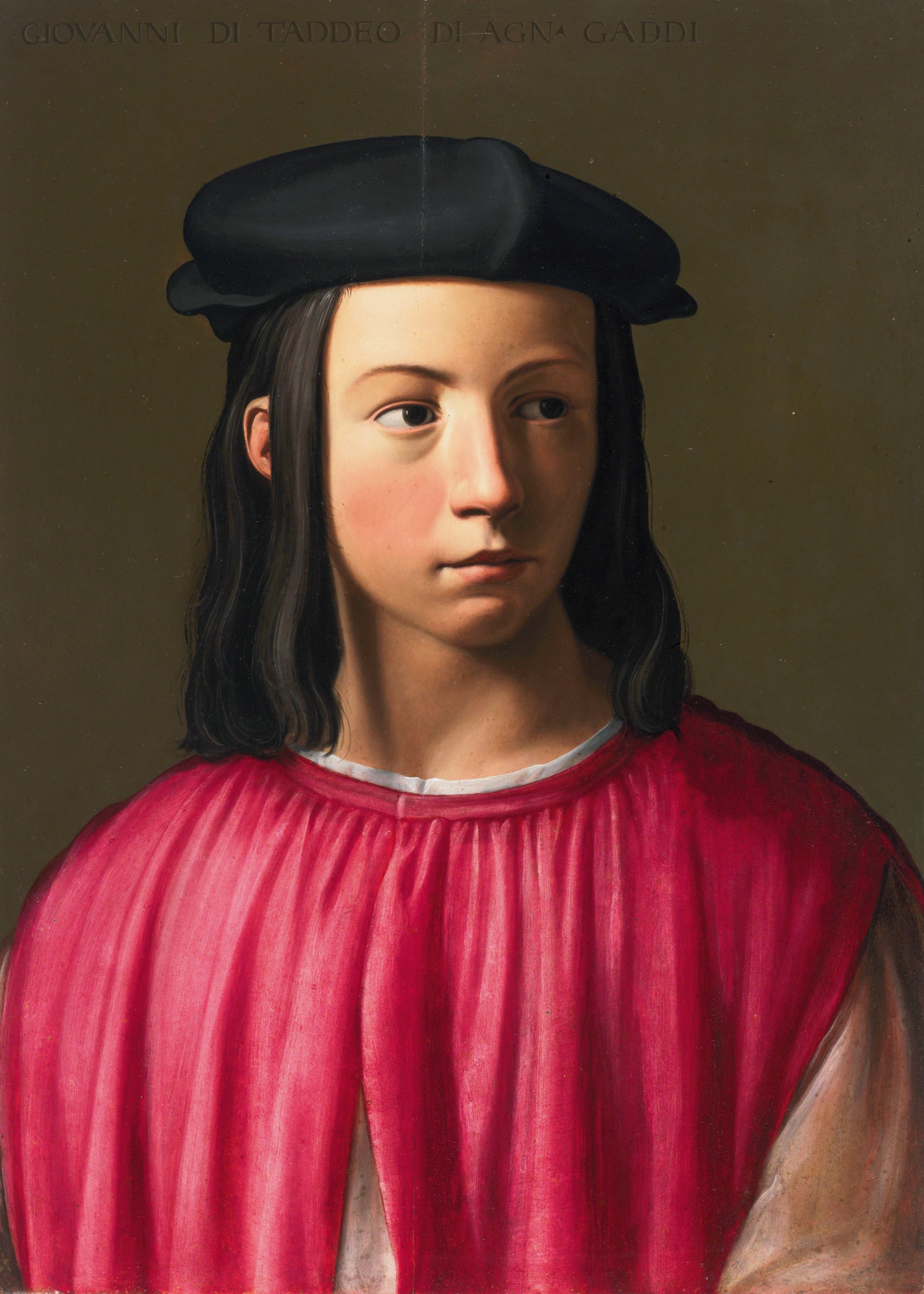
Giovanni Gaddi as a boy (Florentine school of the 16th century)

Monsignor Giovanni Gaddi or Giovanni di Taddeo di Agnolo Gaddi (25 April 1493 in Florence – 18 October 1542 in Rome) was an Italian cleric, descending from the noted Gaddi family of bankers and painters (Gaddo Gaddi, his son Taddeo (a pupil of Giotto) and grandsons Agnolo and Giovanni, active during the 14th century). His parents were Taddeo di Agnolo Gaddi and Antonia di Bindo Altoviti. His brother was cardinal Niccolò Gaddi and his nephew cardinal Taddeo Gaddi.

Giovanni was close to Giuliano de' Medici, Duke of Nemours. They were both members of the Compagnia della Cazzuola; a society that put on theatrical plays. He became a dean of the Camera apostolica and took on several posts in the papal court. Gaddi inherited a collection of illuminated manuscripts and codices from his grandfather. He was associated with many writers, particularly his secretary Annibal Caro, and appeared in Benvenuto Cellini's autobiography.

In 1531, Gaddi received the ten-year privilege of Clement VII for the edition of Machiavelli's works, obtained without the consent of the writer's heirs. Using this privilege, Antonio Blado printed one of the earliest editions of The Prince in Rome in 1532.

After the Sack of Rome (1527) he became one of Sebastiano del Piombo’s close friends.
