= Johann Georg Fischer (painter) =

Johann Georg Fischer, an historical painter, was born at Augsburg in 1580. He travelled in Italy, but became an imitator of Albrecht Dürer. He died at Munich in 1643. The following are by him:

- Munich. Gallery. Christ carrying the Cross and The Apprehension of Christ
- Nuremberg. Landauer-Brüderhaus. The Apostles John, Peter, Mark, and Paul; after Albrecht Dürer.
- Nuremberg. Moritz-Chapel. Ecce Homo (supposed to be him, but by some attributed to Albrecht Dürer).
- Pommersfelden. Gallery. The Trinity; after Albrecht Dürer.

According to Joachim Sandrart he was the father of the painter Susanna Mayr, whose son Johann Ulrich Mayr also became a painter.
