= Giovanni Gaddi =

Giovanni Gaddi may refer to:

- Giovanni Gaddi (painter) (1333–1383), Italian painter
- Giovanni Gaddi (priest) (1493–1542), Italian cleric
