= Johann Rudolf Werdmüller =

Swiss Baroque painter

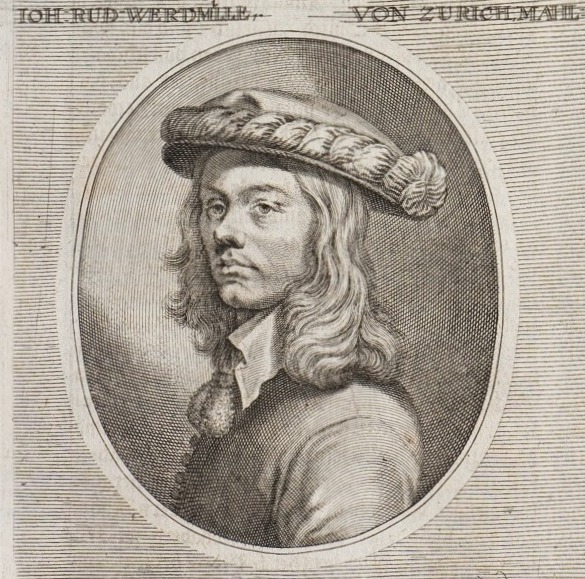
- Werdmüller in Sandrart's 1668 Teutsche Academie, originally engraved by Richard Collin
- Born: 1639; Zürich
- Died: 1668 (aged 28–29); Zürich

Johann Rudolf Werdmüller (1639 – 1668) was a Swiss Baroque painter and medallist.

Werdmüller was born in Zürich as the son of a military officer of the same name. His biography was written by Joachim von Sandrart in his Teutsche Academie, who included an illustration of him, and mentioned he was a pupil of Conrad Meyer. He was known for copies after old masters, and copper reliefs. He travelled to Amsterdam, where he suffered from the "bad air", and spent a winter in Frankfurt learning to paint flowers from Jacob Marrel.

Sandrart also included short biographies of several of his family members. He was perhaps inspired by Werdmüller's unexpected death by drowning in the Sihl river during the year that he was writing, and described this sad event in detail.
