= Niccolò Gaddi =

Italian Roman Catholic cardinal

His Eminence Niccolò Gaddi
- Cardinal-Priest of Santa Maria in Via Lata
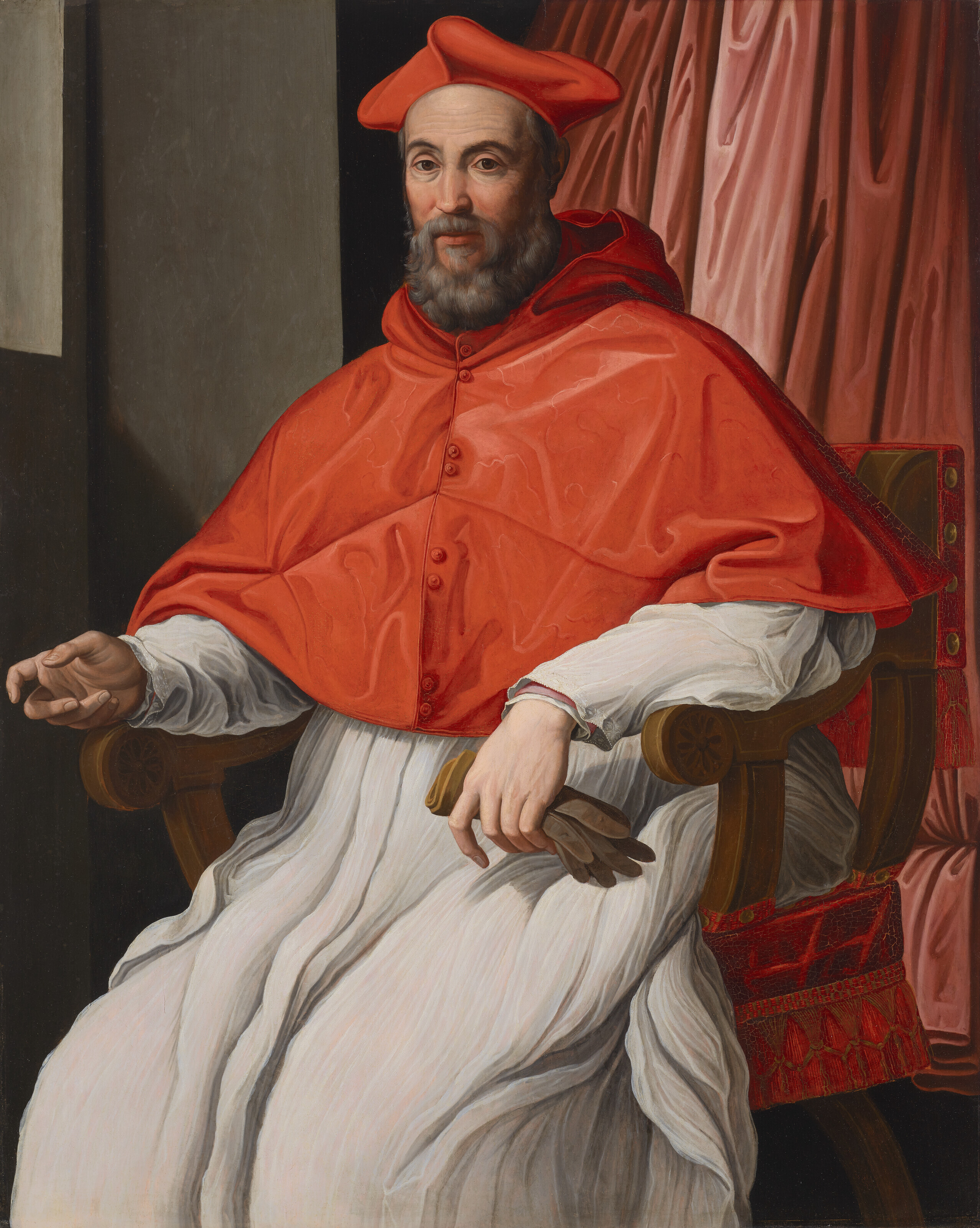
- Portrait by Jacopino del Conte
- Church: Catholic Church
- Appointed: 27 June 1550
- Term ended: 16 January 1552
- Predecessor: Innocenzo Cybo
- Successor: Guido Sforza di Santa Fiora
- Previous posts: Cardinal-Deacon of San Teodoro (1527–1545)

Orders
- Created cardinal: 3 May 1527 by Pope Clement VII
- Rank: Cardinal-Priest

Personal details
- Born: 1499 Florence, Tuscany
- Died: 16 January 1552 (aged 52–53) Florence, Tuscany
- Buried: Santa Maria Novella
- Coat of arms

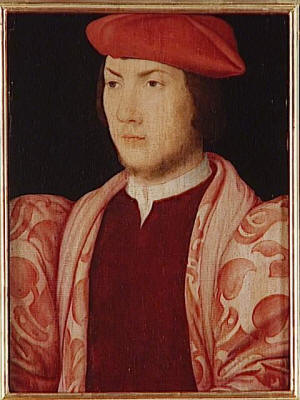
Niccolò Gaddi

Niccolò Gaddi (1499–1552) was an Italian Roman Catholic cardinal.

== Biography ==
Niccolò Gaddi was born in Florence in 1499, the son of Taddeo Gaddi and Antonia Altoviti. He was a direct descendant of medieval painter Taddeo Gaddi. He was the uncle of Cardinal Taddeo Gaddi and a relative of Catherine de' Medici.

He began his career in Rome as a cleric in the Apostolic Camera. He then became an abbreviator of Apostolic Letters.

On 16 October 1521 he was elected Bishop of Fermo. He was never consecrated as a bishop and he resigned the administration of the see sometime before 5 December 1544.

Pope Clement VII made him a cardinal deacon in the consistory of 3 May 1527. He received the red hat and the deaconry of San Teodoro on the same day.

During the Sack of Rome (1527), he was assigned as a hostage for Pope Clement VII. Imperial troops held him prisoner in the fortress in Naples for a long time.

He was the administrator of the metropolitan see of Cosenza from 31 January 1528 until 21 June 1535. In 1533, he was named cardinal protector of the Kingdom of France. He was administrator of the see of Sarlat from 12 December 1533 until 3 July 1545.

He participated in the papal conclave of 1534 that elected Pope Paul III. On 9 January 1545 he opted for the deaconry of Santi Vito, Modesto e Crescenzia. He participated in the papal conclave of 1549-50 that elected Pope Julius III. On 28 February 1550 he opted for the deaconry of Santa Maria in Domnica and on 27 June 1550 for the deaconry of Santa Maria in Via Lata. At this time, he became cardinal protodeacon. On 20 November 1551 he opted for the order of cardinal priests and his deaconry was raised pro illa vice to titulus.

He died in Florence on 16 January 1552. He is buried in the Basilica of Santa Maria Novella.
