= Johann Ulrich Mayr =

German Baroque painter

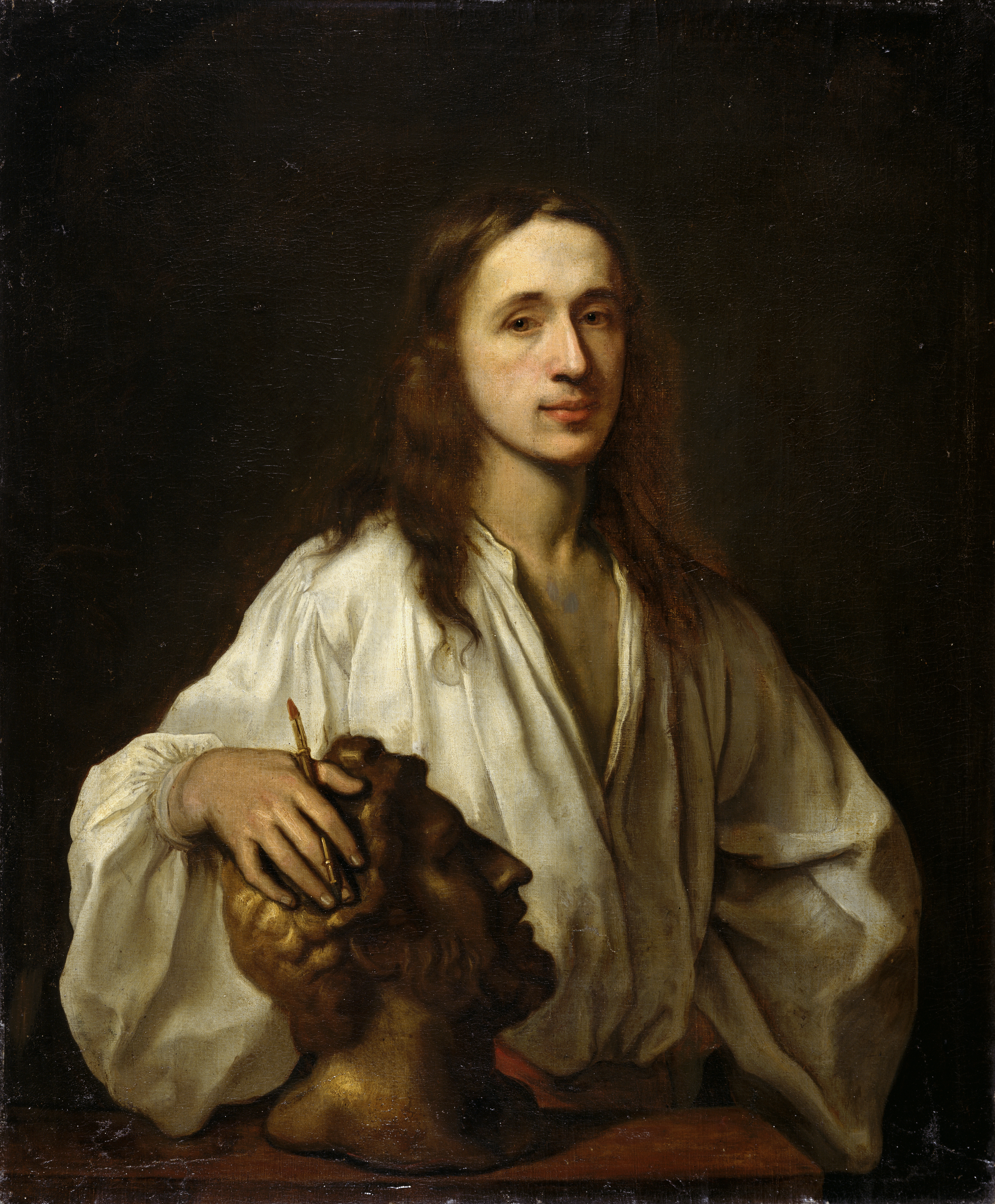
Self-Portrait with an Antique Head

Johann Ulrich Mayr or Hans Ulrich Mayr, last name sometimes rendered as Mayer and Mair (1629 in Augsburg – 1704 in Augsburg) was a German Baroque painter and art educator. He is known for his portraits, genre scenes and religious subjects. He served as a court painter for several German and Austrian courts, notably the Electoral Court of Munich and the House of Habsburg in Vienna. His portraits were reproduced as engravings. He was director of the Academy of Fine Arts in Augsburg.

== History ==
According to the German painter and artist biographer Joachim von Sandrart, he was the son of Georg Christoph Mayr, a Protestant merchant from Augsburg, and the painter Susanna Mayr. His maternal grandfather was Johann Georg Fischer, a painter and goldsmith.

He received his initial training in Augsburg. He began working as a painter in Amsterdam in 1648, where he was a pupil of Rembrandt. The following year, he moved to Antwerp, where he was a pupil of Jacob Jordaens.

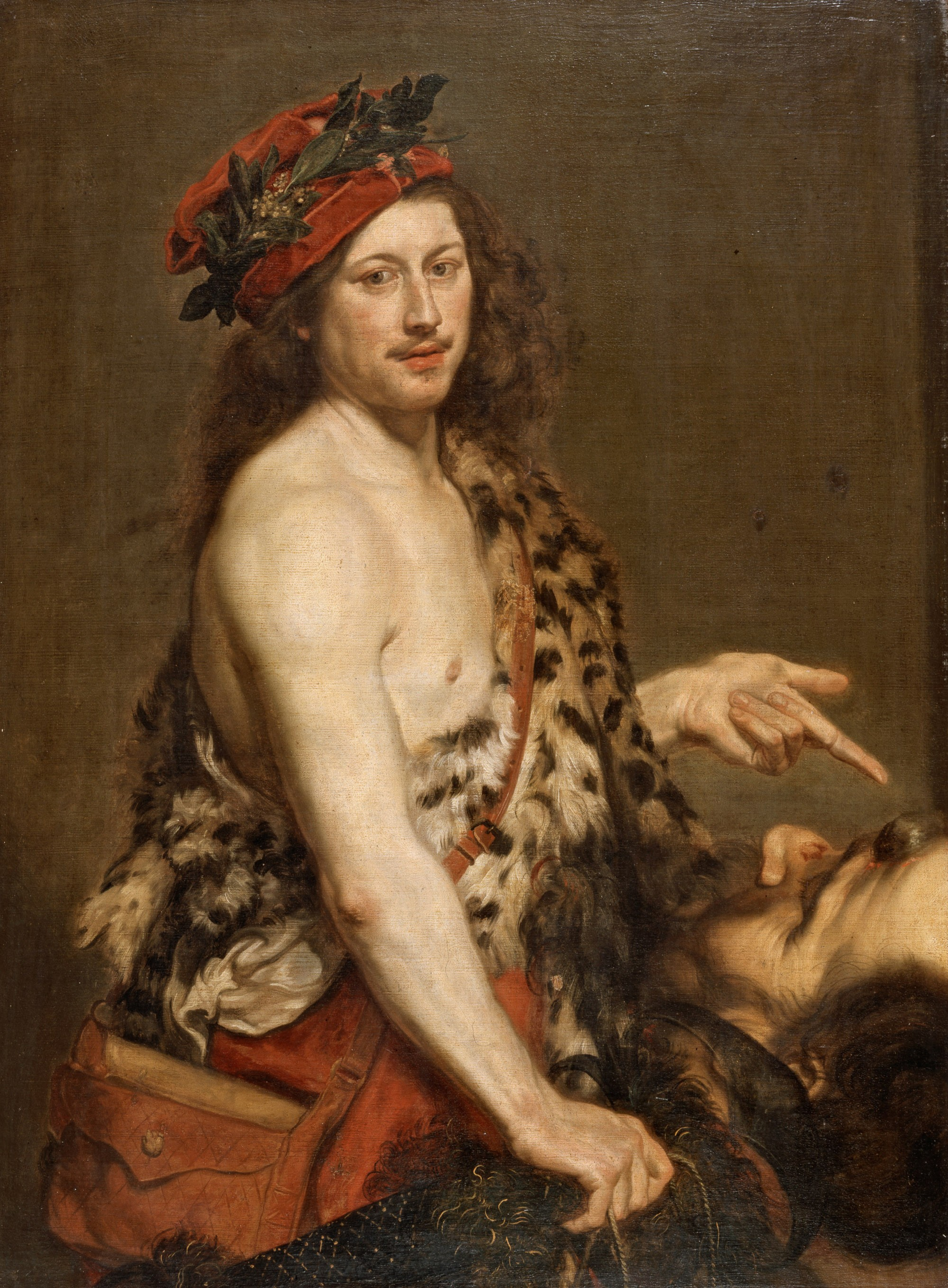
Portrait of a Man as David with the Head of Goliath

He then travelled to Great Britain and subsequently to Italy. By the late 1650s, he was working as a painter at the Electoral Court in Munich. Between 1657 and 1660 he was active in Vienna where he painted portraits of members of the imperial family and many other aristocrats such as the noble Harrach family, the Pálffy family and the Dietrichstein family. In 1659 or 1660, he was commissioned to paint a portrait of Archduke Leopold Wilhelm of Austria (collection of the Kunsthistorisches Museum in Vienna). He received a generous fee, as well as a medal and a gold chain.

He returned to settle permanently in Augsburg around 1661, where he married in 1662. In 1665, he was awarded the title of master there. In 1667, he received a visit of the future Grand Duke of Tuscany, Cosimo III de' Medici (born in 1639, Grand Duke from 1670 to 1723).

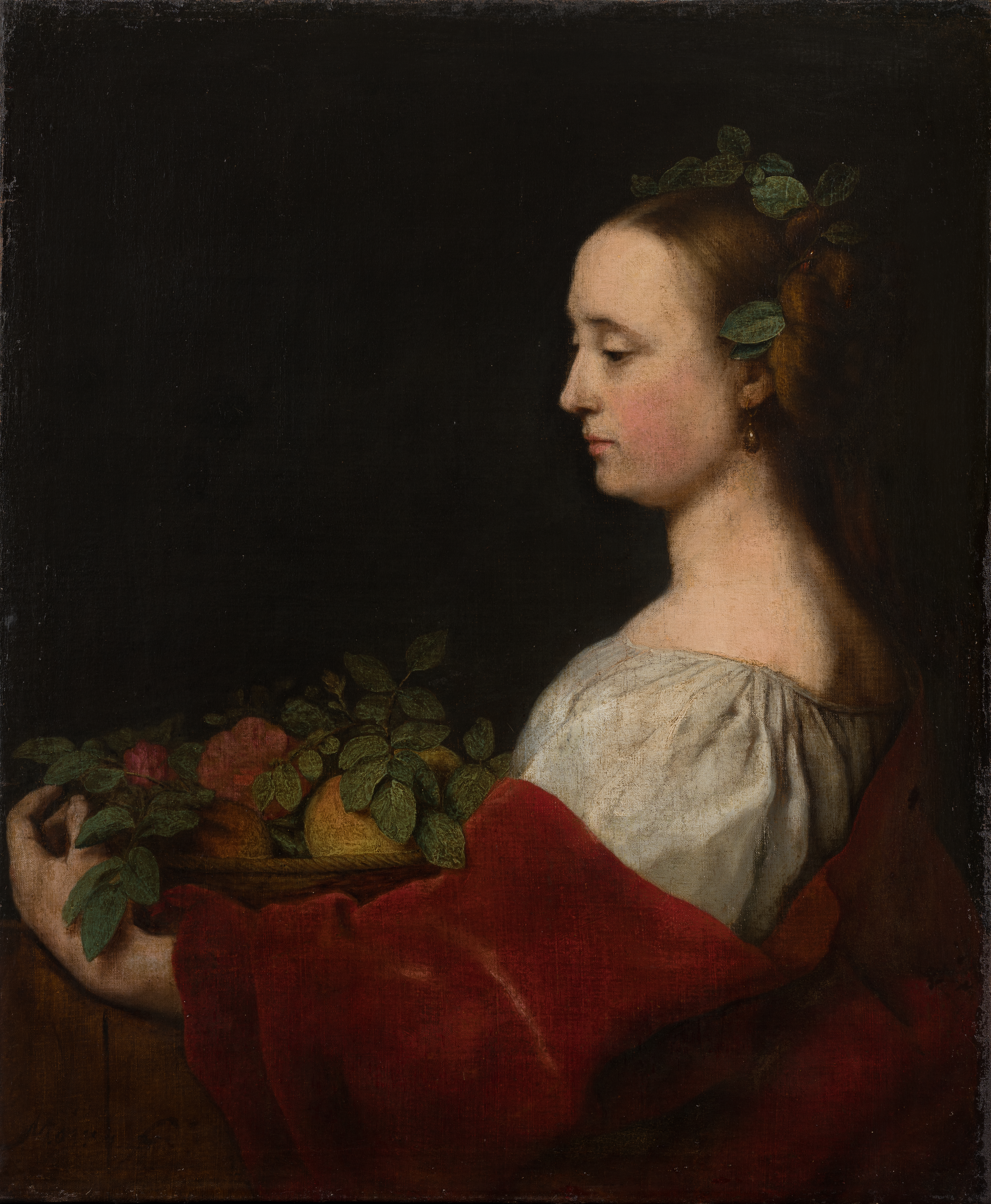
Woman holding a basket of fruit

In 1684, Mayr became director of the Academy of Fine Arts in Augsburg, alongside Sigmund Müller, a pupil of Joachim von Sandrart. Mayr worked for several royal houses in the German-speaking world. According to historical sources, he held the title of painter to the imperial court. Mayr died in 1704 in his hometown of Augsburg and was buried there on 11 June.

== Work ==
While he was mainly a portrait painter, he also created religious works for the local churches and genre scenes. His earliest works date from the 1650s, notably a self-portrait and two portraits of his parents, which show Rembrandt's influence. His portraits were reproduced and circulated in numerous engravings and etchings.
