= Annibale Caro =

Italian poet and Knight of Malta

Annibale Caro K.M.
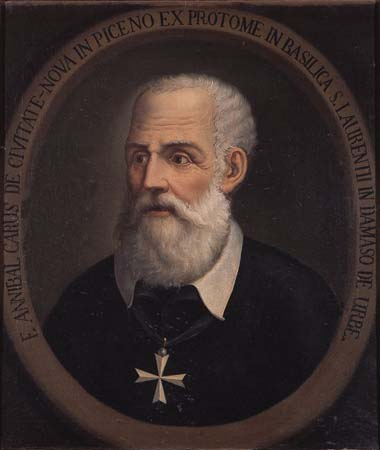
- Portrait of Annibale Caro, c. 1562
- Born: 6 June 1507; Civitanova Marche, Papal States
- Died: 17 November 1566 (aged 59); Rome, Papal States
- Resting place: San Lorenzo in Damaso
- Occupations: Poet; Intellectual
- Known for: Italian translation of the Aeneid of Vergil
- Parent(s): Giambattista Caro and Celanzia Caro (née Centofiorini)
- Writing career
- Language: Italian, Latin
- Genres: Poetry; pamphlet; treatise
- Literary movement: Late Renaissance

Fra' Annibale Caro, K.M., (6 June 1507 – 17 November 1566) was an Italian writer and poet.

== Biography ==
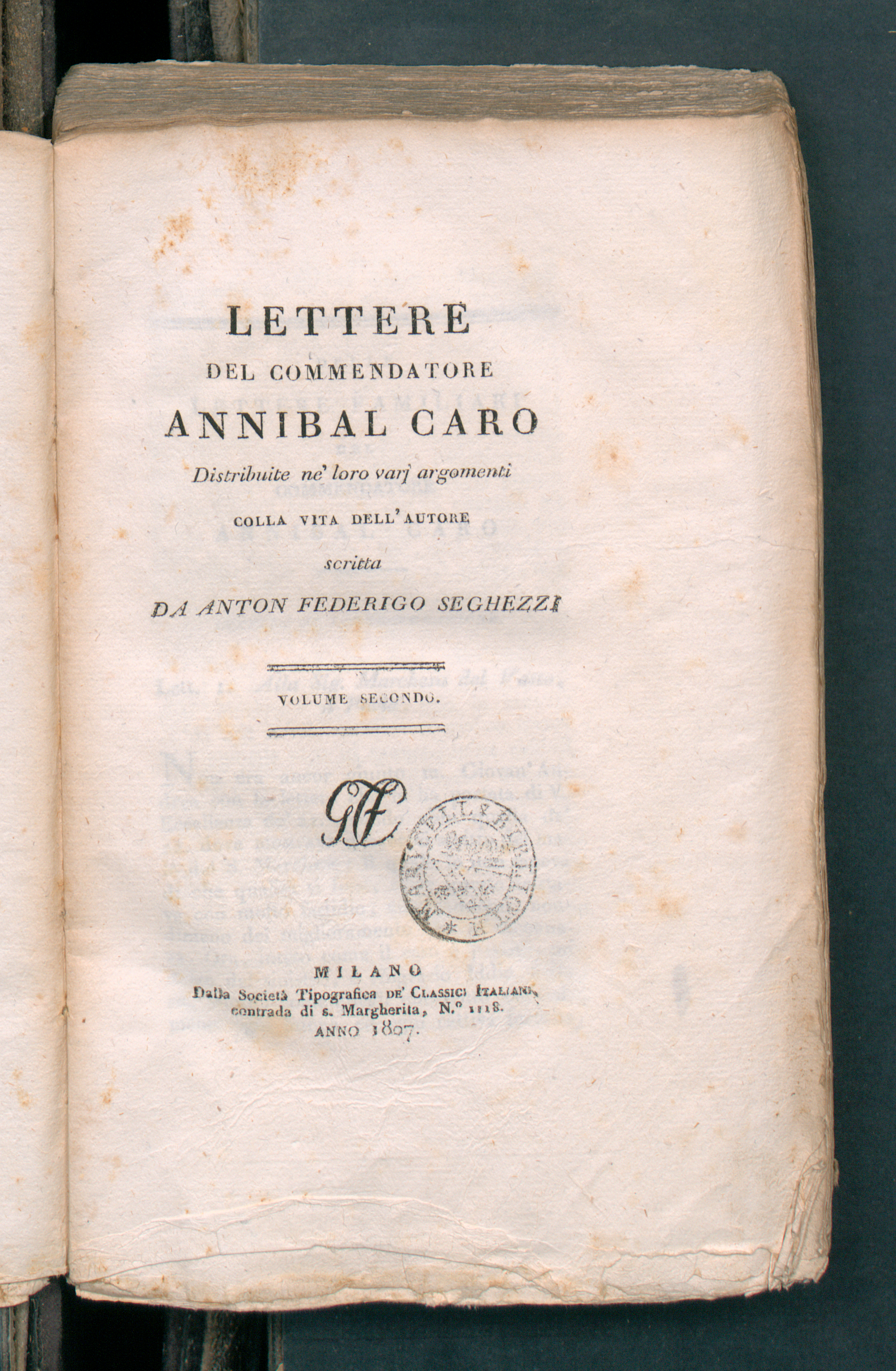
Lettere del commendatore Annibal Caro (1807)

Born in Civitanova Marche, then in the March of Ancona, Caro became tutor to the wealthy family of Lodovico Gaddi in Florence, and then secretary to Lodovico's brother Giovanni. At Gaddi's death, he entered the service of the Farnese family, and became confidential secretary to Pier Luigi Farnese, Duke of Parma, and to his sons, Duke Ottavio and Cardinals Ranuccio and Alexander.

Caro's most important work were his translations (see below). He is also the author of poems, sonnets, and a comedy called Gli Straccioni. His work additionally includes two clever jeux d'esprit: La Ficheide, in praise of figs, and a eulogy of the big nose of Leoni Ancona, a local figure. His poetry is noted for the freedom and grace of its versification, so that many claim that he brought verso sciolto to its highest form in Italy. Letters he wrote, both in his own name and on behalf of the Cardinals Farnese, are considered remarkable for both the baseness they display and for their euphemistic polish and elegance.

Caro's fame was diminished because of the virulence with which he attacked Lodovico Castelvetro in one of his canzoni, and by his meanness for denouncing him to the Church for translating some of the writings of Philipp Melanchthon, an associate of Martin Luther.

In 1555 Caro was installed as a "knight of grace" (a member not taking religious vows) of the Order of Malta by Cardinal Alessandro Farnese.

Caro died in Frascati in 1566 and was buried in the Church of San Lorenzo in Damaso in Rome. His prose includes translations of Aristotle, Cyprian, and Gregory Nazianzen.

== The translations ==
Annibal Caro published a translation of the Aeneid of Vergil, which was much admired by contemporaries, and still is read with pleasure by the lovers of the Italian language. Another translation, which remained the standard one for several centuries, is that of Daphnis and Chloe, the ancient Greek novel by Longus.

== Bibliography ==
- Stefano Jossa, ‘Nature vs. Grammar: Annibal Caro’s Apologia as a Manifesto for Orality’, in Luca Degl'Innocenti; Brian Richardson; Chiara Sbordoni (eds), Interactions between Orality and Writing in Early Modern Italian Culture (London: Routledge, 2016), pp. 173–86.
