= Taddeo Gaddi (cardinal) =

Italian Roman Catholic cardinal and bishop

Taddeo Gaddi (1520–1561) was an Italian Roman Catholic cardinal and bishop.

Gaddi was born in Florence on 22 January 1520, the son of Luigi Gaddi and Caterina Gomiel. He was a direct descendant of painter Taddeo Gaddi, for whom he was named. He was the nephew of Cardinal Niccolò Gaddi.

He was educated in the law. On 21 June 1535 he was elected Archbishop of Cosenza. He was the administrator of the archdiocese until he reached the canonical age of 27. He governed the archdiocese through vicars. He became archpriest and a canon of the cathedral chapter of Florence Cathedral. In 1536, he became pastor of the Basilica of Santa Maria Novella. In 1552, he became a referendary apostolic.

Pope Paul IV made him a cardinal priest in the consistory of 15 March 1557. He received the red hat and the titular church of San Silvestro in Capite on 24 March 1557.

He was a participant in the papal conclave of 1559 that elected Pope Pius IV.

He died of stomach flu at the monastery of San Leonardo, Apulia on 22 December 1561. He was buried in his family tomb in the Basilica of Santa Maria Novella.

== See also ==
- Catholic Church in Italy
