= Richard Collin =

Luxembourgish engraver (1626–1698)

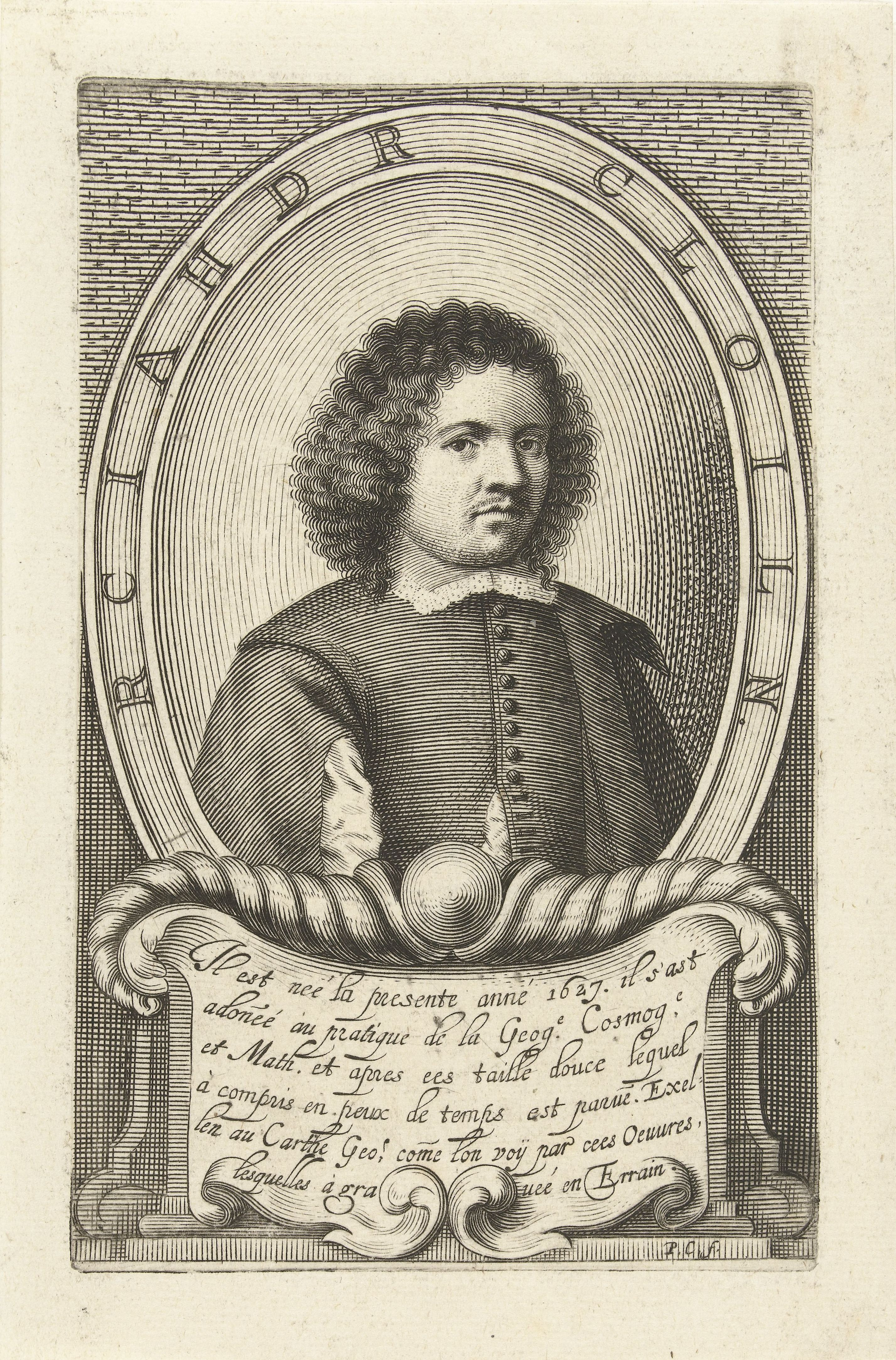
Portrait of Richard Collin

Richard Collin (1626, Luxembourg – 1698, Brussels), was an engraver from Luxembourg.

== Biography ==
According to the RKD he was a pupil of Joachim von Sandrart in Rome, and became a master in the Antwerp Guild of St. Luke in 1650–1651. He worked in Rome and in Antwerp, and is known for portraits he engraved for Cornelis de Bie's book of artists called Het Gulden Cabinet. In the 1660s he took on pupils, and in 1678 he moved to Brussels and became the court engraver for Charles II of Spain. His engraving of Christina, Queen of Sweden is held in the Victoria and Albert Museum.

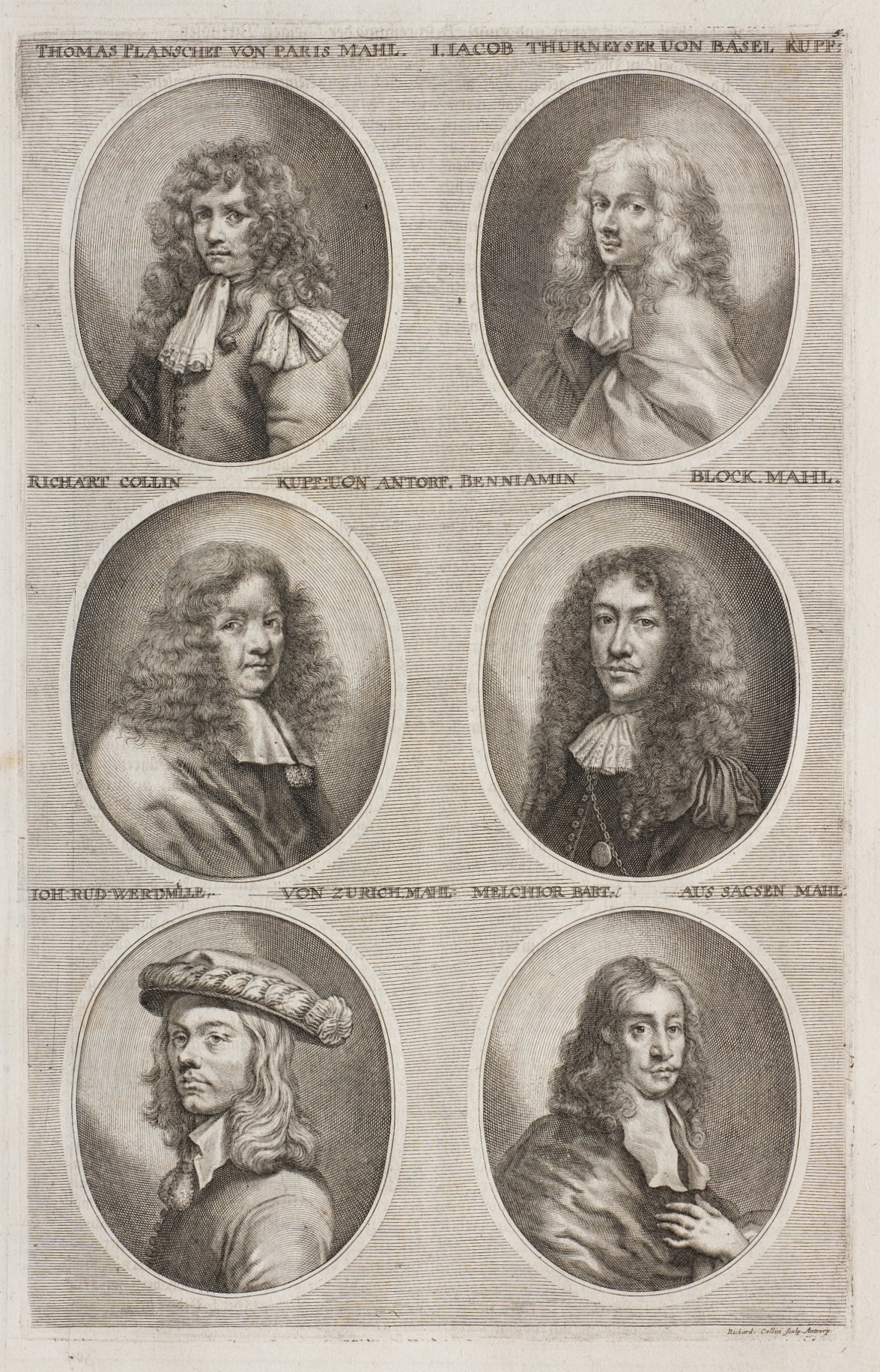
Richard Collin middle left in Sandrart's Teutsche Academie

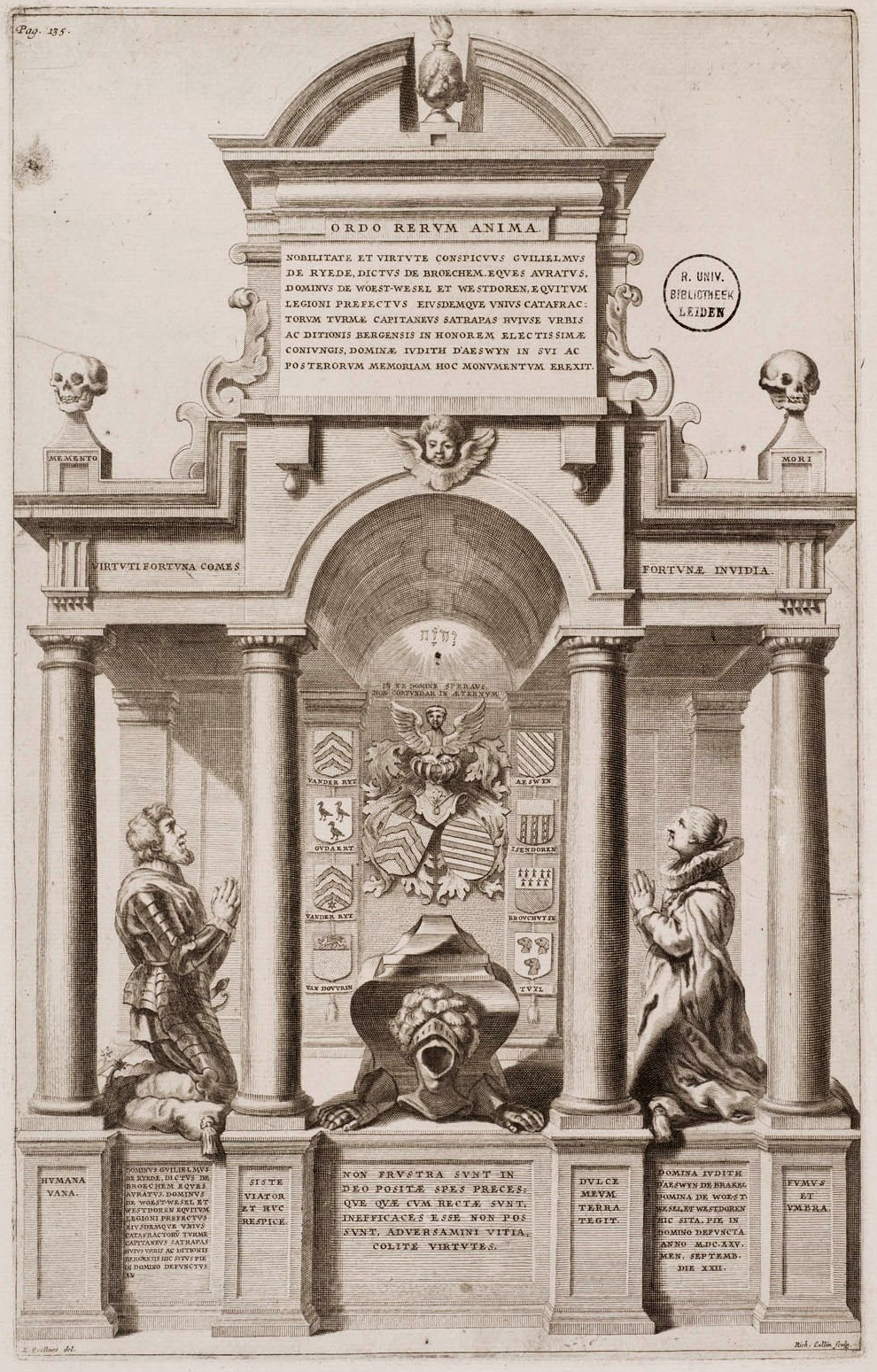
Engraving by Richard Collin after a design by Erasmus Quellinus II of the Tomb of Willem van der Rijt and Judith van Aeswyn, 1641, Sint-Gertrudiskerk, Bergen op Zoom
