= Esther Barbara Bloemart =

German art collector

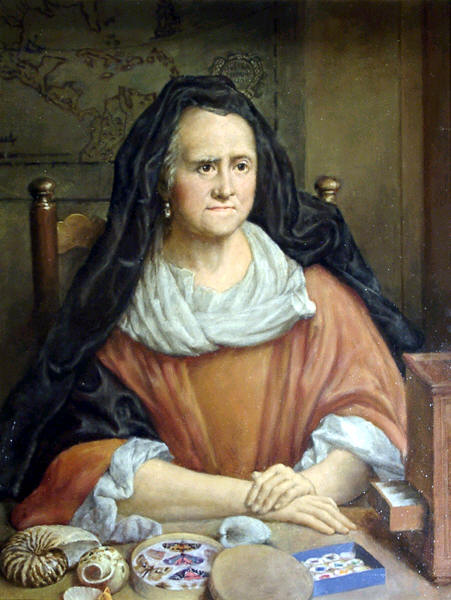
- Portrait of Esther Barbara von Sandrart, 18th century, by Georg Desmarées
- Born: 1651
- Died: 1733 (aged 81–82)
- Other names: Esther Barbara von Sandart
- Spouse: Joachim von Sandrart (m. 1673–1688, death)

Esther Barbara Bloemart, also known as Esther Barbara von Sandrart (1651–1733), was a German art collector.

== Biography ==
Esther Barbara Bloemart was born on 7 June 1651 in Germany. Her father was banker Wilhelm Bloemart and her mother was Anna Elisabeth Bloemart (née Salmuthin), they lived in Nuremberg.

In 1673, she was married to biographer Joachim von Sandrart, as his second wife. Bloemart was 45 years younger than Sandart. When her husband died in 1688, she began collecting objects. Her collection was housed in Nuremberg and was intensive; it spanned from natural objects like butterflies to coins, ethnographic artifacts, and more.

Artist Georg Desmarées made portraits of Bloemart, including in engraving and painting.
