= Susanne Maria von Sandrart =

German engraver (1658–1716)

- Susanne Maria von Sandrart, engraving by Gabrielle Carola Patina, c. 1682,
- Born: 10 August 1658; Nuremberg, Germany
- Died: 20 December 1716 (aged 58); Nuremberg, Germany
- Known for: Engraving

Susanne Maria von Sandrart (10 August 1658 in Nuremberg – 20 December 1716 in Nuremberg) was a German artist and engraver. She was the daughter of engraver Jacob von Sandrart, and most of her work was produced for his workshop. At a young age, Von Sandrart began to learn different means of graphic art, producing artwork from her father's home studio.

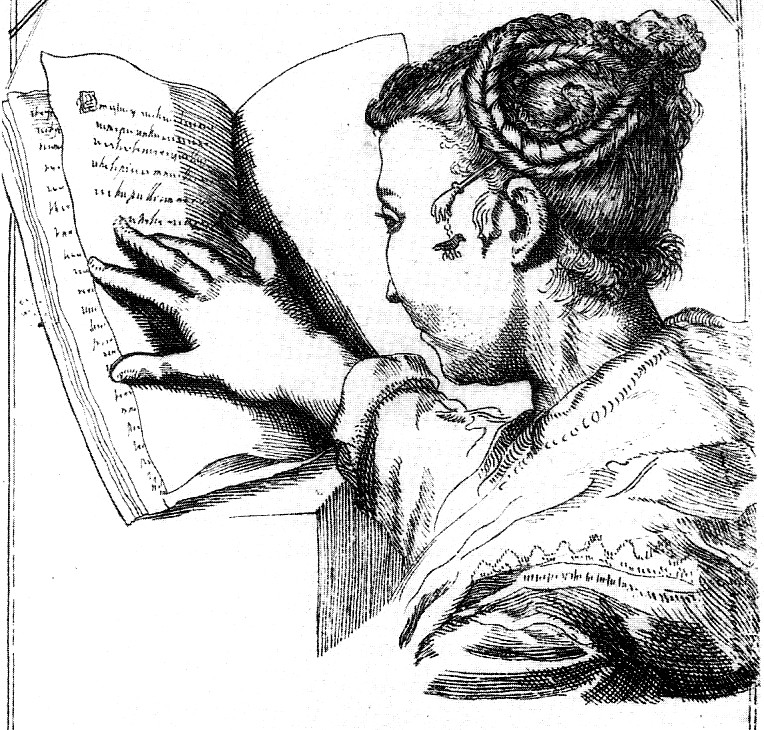
Reading woman (c.1690), tusche on paper.
