= Giovanni Gaddi (painter) =

14th-century Italian painter

Giovanni Gaddi (after 1333–1383) was an Italian painter. He was the son of Taddeo Gaddi and the brother of Agnolo Gaddi. Giorgio Vasari wrote that Gaddi was a painter in his own right. He painted frescoes in the Florence church of Santo Spirito and was called to work at the Vatican under Urban V between 1367 and 1370. Some have identified him as the Master of the Madonna della Misericordia at the Accademia, Venice.
