= Jacob von Sandrart =

German engraver

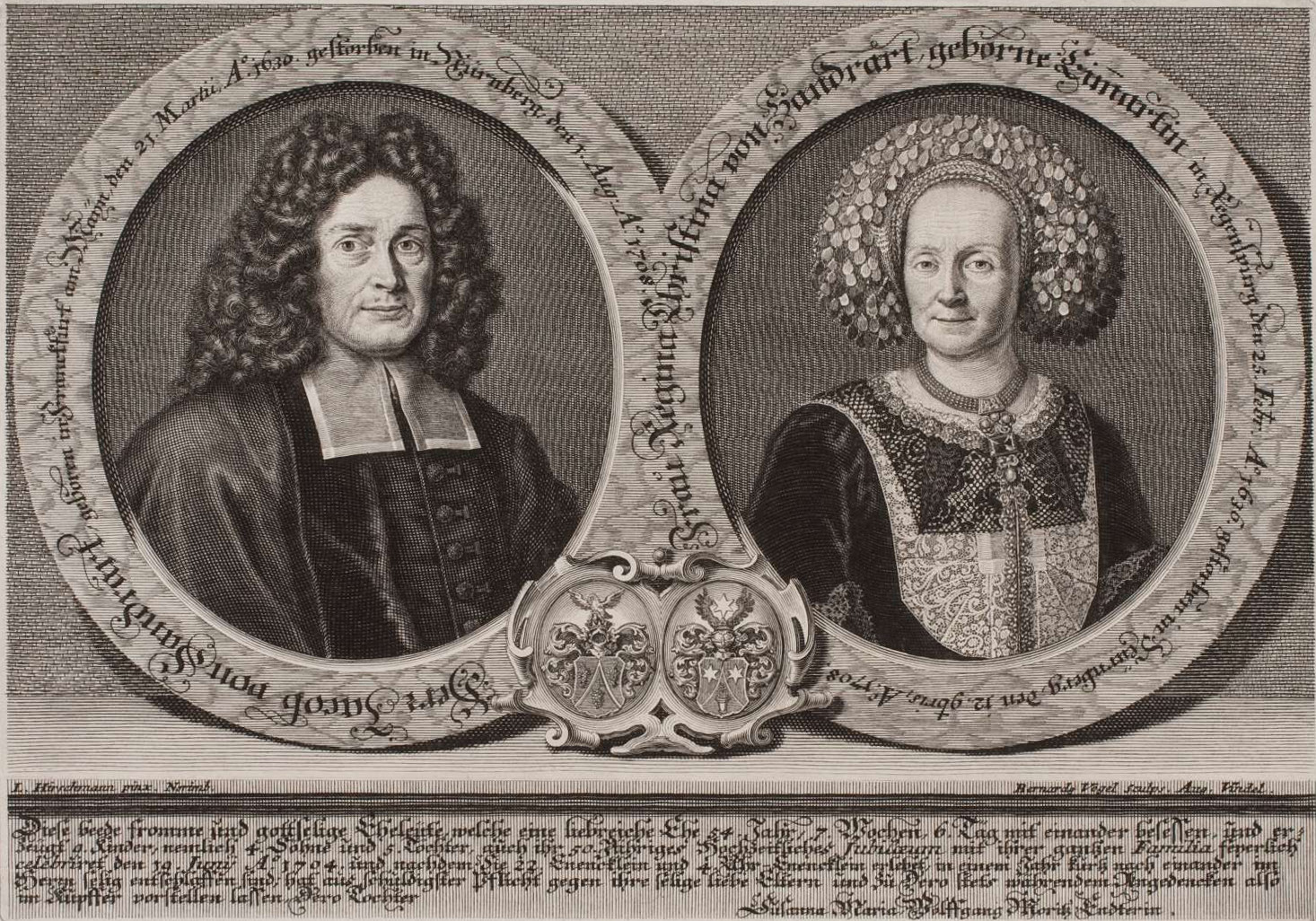
Jacob and Regina Christina von Sandrart

Jacob von Sandrart (3 May 1630, Frankfurt am Main – 15 August 1708, Nuremberg) was a German engraver primarily active in Nuremberg.

At age ten Sandrart obtained his artistic training from his better-known uncle Joachim von Sandrart in Amsterdam. After spending time in Danzig and Regensburg, he married Regina Christina Eimart, daughter of the engraver Georg Christoph Eimart the elder, on 10 June 1654. The couple settled in Nuremberg in 1656 and remained there for the rest of their lives. His daughter Susanne Maria von Sandrart was also an artist and engraver.

Sandrart was a very prolific artist; over 400 engravings from his hand are extant. He was best known as a portraitist of prominent contemporary citizens of Nuremberg, as an engraver of maps, and as an illustrator of the literary works of Nuremberg writers, especially Sigmund von Birken. Today Sandrart is best remembered as the founder and first director of the Nuremberg Academy of Fine Arts (est. 1662).
