= Susanna Mayr =

German artist (1600–1674)

- Born: 1600; Augsburg, Germany
- Died: 1674 (aged 73–74); Augsburg, Germany
- Known for: Painting
- Movement: Baroque
- Spouse: Christoph Mayr (m. 1622)

Susanna Mayr (1600, Augsburg – 1674, Augsburg), was a German Baroque painter.

== Biography ==
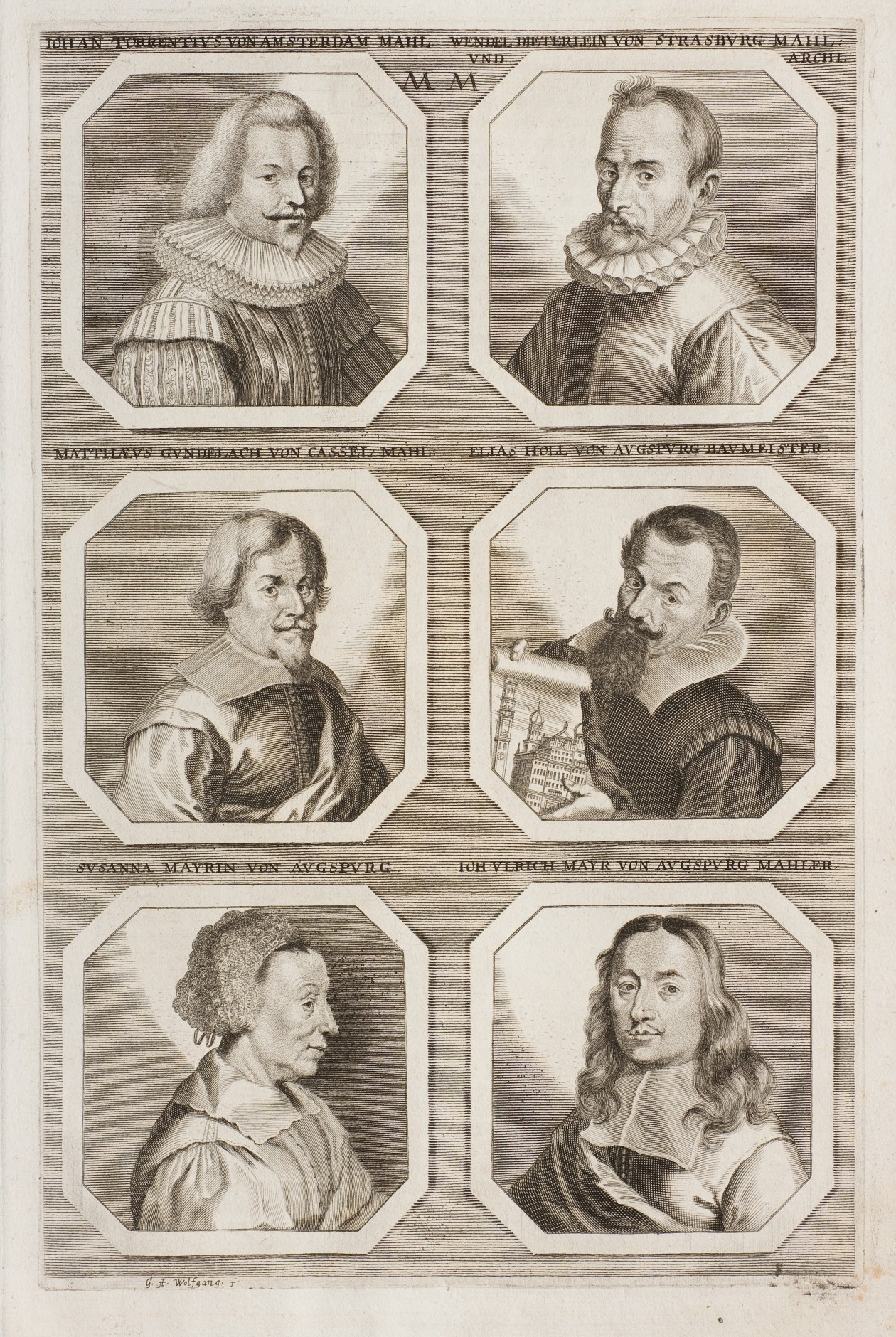
Her engraved portrait was included across from her son's in Sandrart's book of painters in 1683

According to Joachim von Sandrart she was the daughter of the painter Johann Georg Fischer and the mother of Johann Ulrich Mayr, who was also a painter. Besides drawing and painting, she was also a talented cut-out artist.

== See also ==
- List of German women artists
