= San Giovanni dei Fieri, Pisa =

Church of San Giovanni dei Fieri
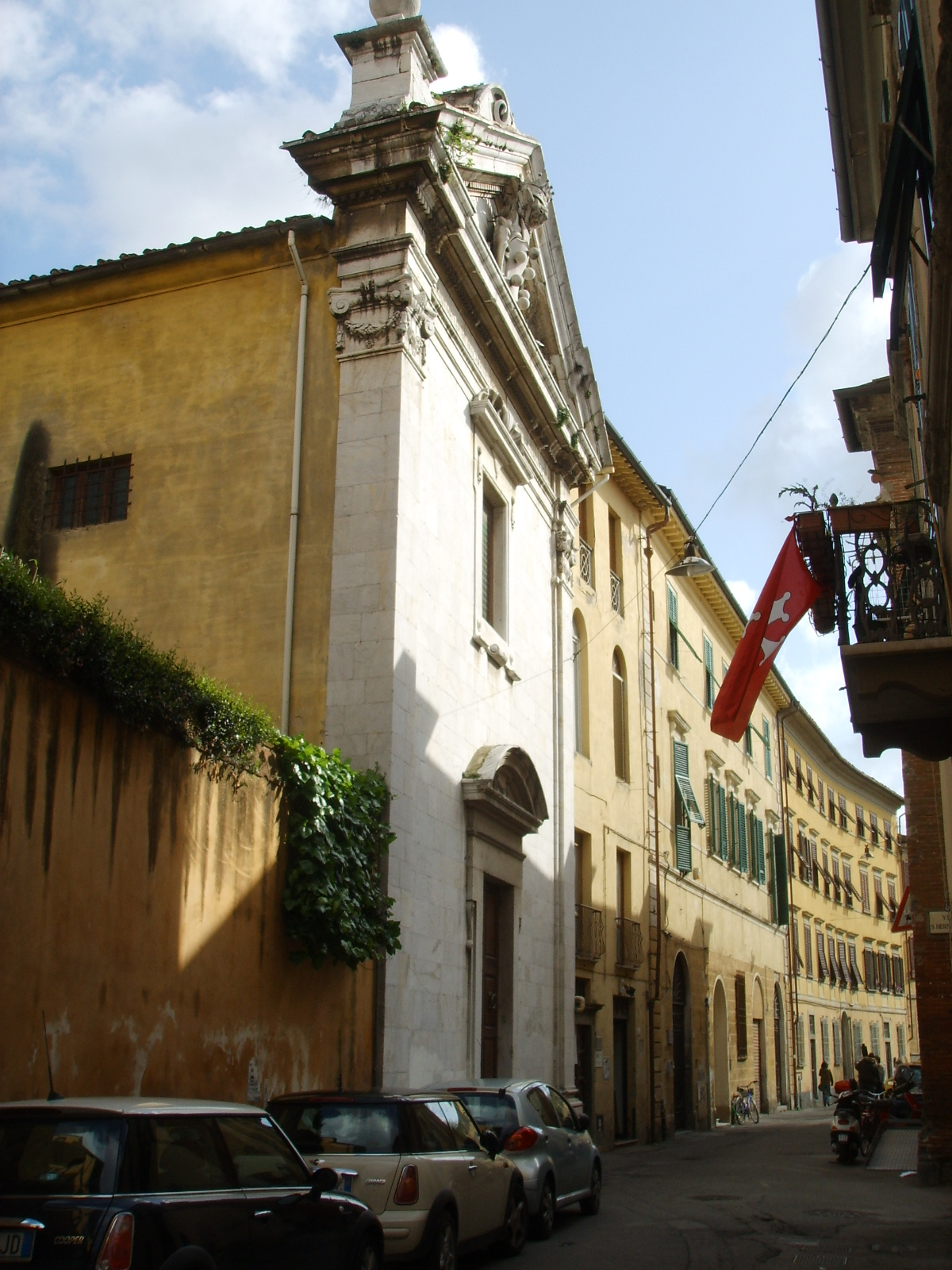
- Church of San Giovanni dei Fieri
- 43°42′47.72″N 11°24′10.77″E
- Location: Pisa
- Country: Italy
- Denomination: Seventh-day Adventist
- Previous denomination: Catholic Church

Architecture
- Architectural type: Church
- Groundbreaking: 12th century
- Completed: 1614

Administration
- Province: Pisa

San Giovanni dei Fieri is an ancient church in Pisa, Italy, located on Via Pietro Gori on the left bank of the Arno.

In the 12th century it was known as San Giovannino. In 1614, the church was renovated by the architect Cosimo Pugliani. The church belonged to the Order of St John of Jerusalem, which also owned the church of Santo Sepolcro. The church currently belongs to the Seventh-day Adventist Church. The white marble façade recalls the churches of San Matteo and San Francesco in the same city.

== Sources ==
- Barsali, U.; Castelli, U.; Gagetti, R.; Parra, O. (1999). Storia e Capolavori di Pisa. Florence: Bonechi.
- Donati, Roberto. Pisa. Arte e storia. Narni: Plurigraf.
