= Agnolo Gaddi =

Italian painter of Florence (c.1350–1396)

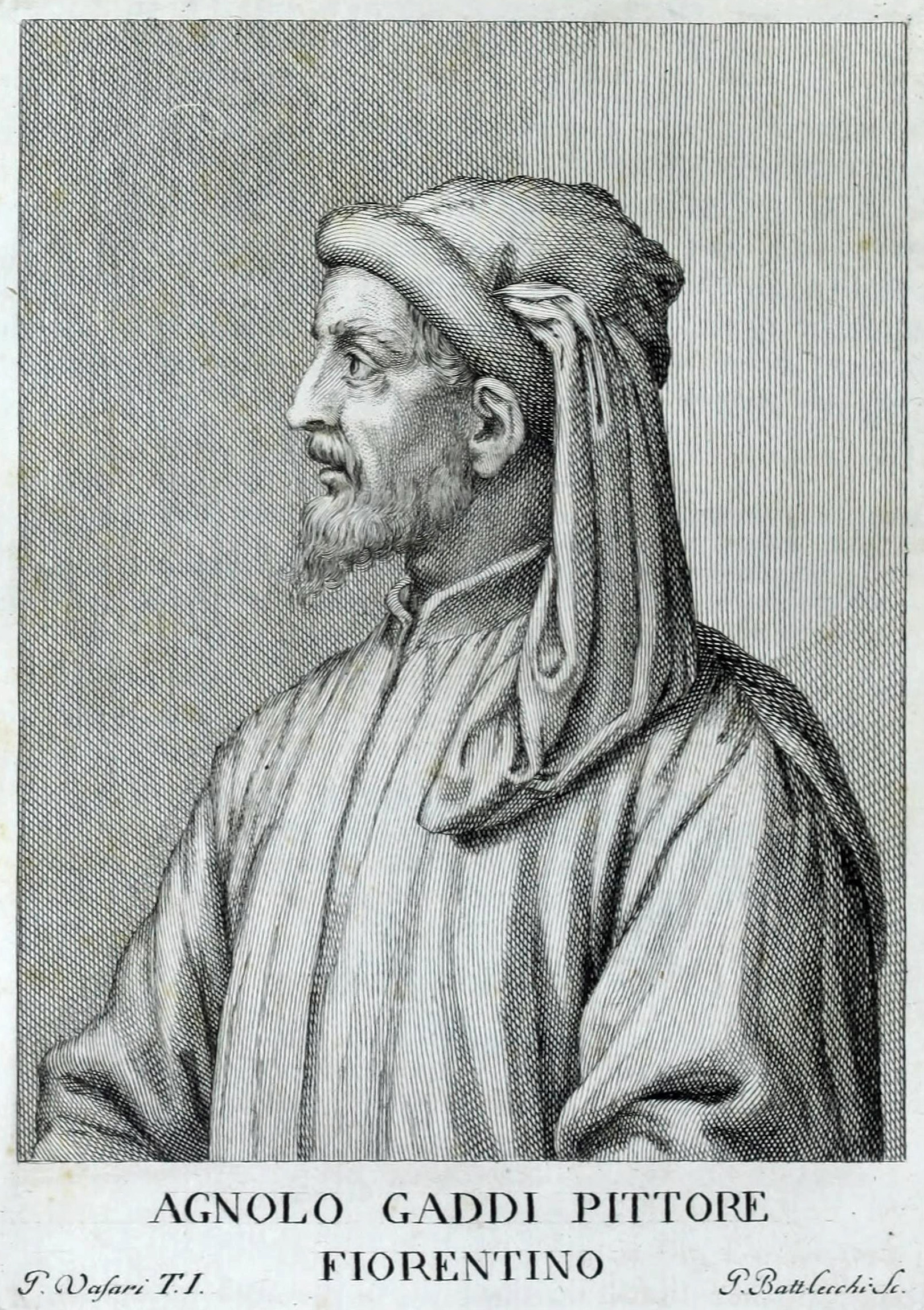
- Imaginary portrait of Agnolo Gaddi (18th ct.)
- Born: Agnolo di Taddeo Gaddi c. 1350; Florence, Italy
- Died: October 10, 1396; Florence, Italy
- Occupation: Painter
- Years active: 1369–1396
- Relatives: Taddeo Gaddi (Father)

Agnolo Gaddi (c.1350–1396) was an Italian painter. He was born and died in Florence, and was the son of the painter Taddeo Gaddi, who was himself the major pupil of the Florentine master Giotto.

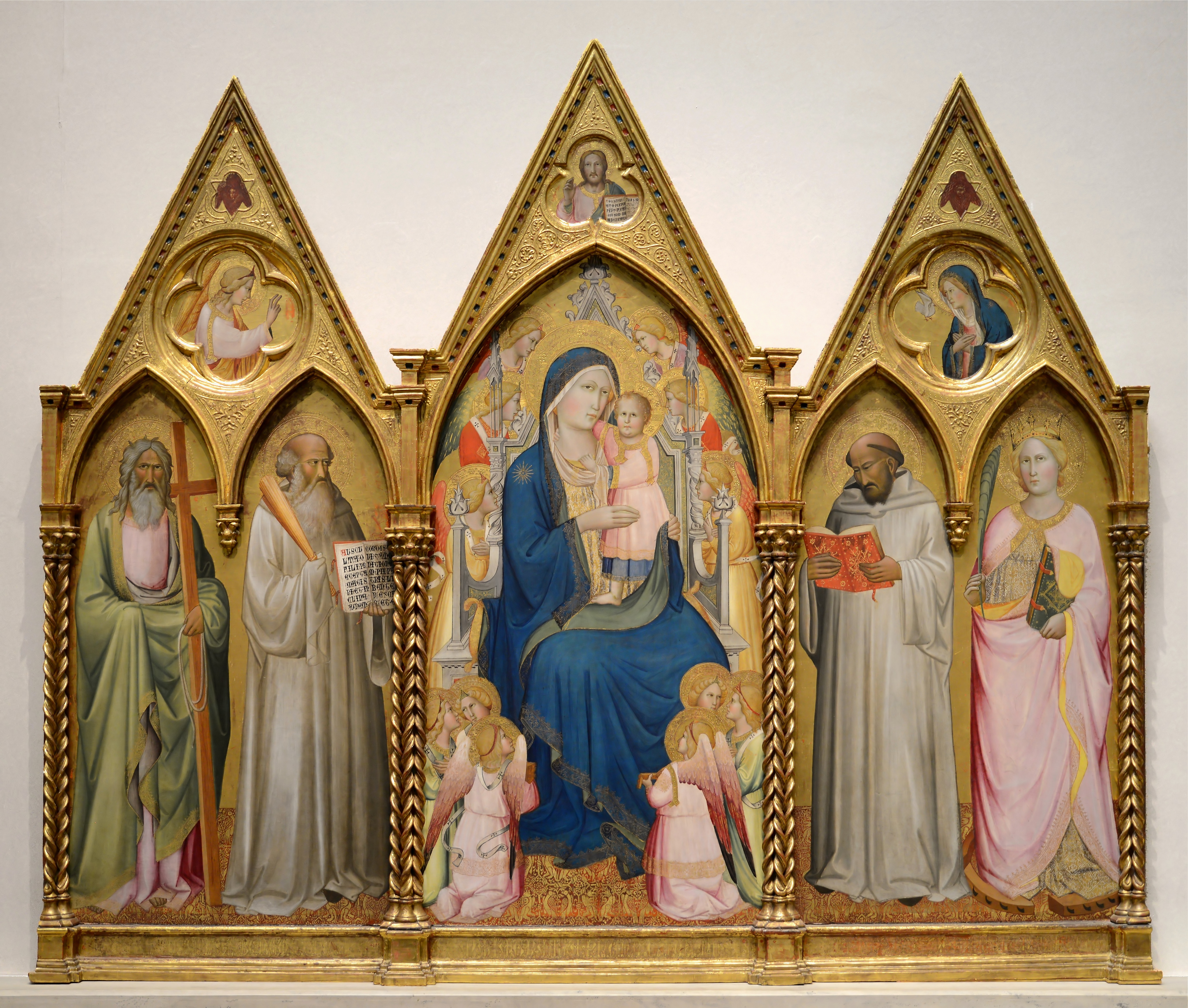
Madonna Enthroned with Saints and Angels (before 1387)

Agnolo was a painter and mosaicist, trained by his father, and a merchant as well; in middle age he settled down to commercial life in Venice, and he added greatly to the family wealth. He died in Florence in October 1396.

Agnolo was an influential and prolific artist who was the last major Florentine painter stylistically descended from Giotto. His paintings show much early promise, although Rossetti (1911) suggests his abilities did not progress as he advanced in life. One of the earliest works, at San Jacopo tra i Fossi, Florence, represents the "Resurrection of Lazarus." Another probably youthful performance is the series of frescoes of the Prato Cathedral—legends of the Virgin and of her Sacred Girdle; the "Marriage of Mary" is one of the best of this series, the later compositions in which have suffered much by renewals. In Santa Croce, Florence he painted, in eight frescoes, the legend of the Cross, beginning with the archangel Michael giving Seth a branch from the Tree of Knowledge, and ending with the emperor Heraclius carrying the Cross as he enters Jerusalem; in this picture is a portrait of the painter himself.

Among his pupils was the author of an art treatise, Cennino Cennini, who mentions him in the book.

Giorgio Vasari included a biography of Agnolo Gaddi in his Lives of the Most Excellent Painters, Sculptors, and Architects.

== Paintings ==
- Enthroned Madonna and Child with Saints (c. 1375) tempera on panel at Galleria nazionale di Parma
- Madonna and Child with Saints Andrew, Benedict, Bernard, and Catherine of Alexandria with Angels (before 1387), tempera on panel, National Gallery of Art, Andrew W. Mellon Collection, Washington, D.C.. Triptych, possibly commissioned for a Cistercian monastery.
- Legend of the True Cross (1385-1387), frescoe cycle in the choir of Santa Croce, Florence
- Madonna and Child with Saint John the Evangelist, Saint John the Baptist, Saint James of Compostela and Saint Nicholas of Bari (1388-1390), tempera on panel, National Gallery of Victoria
- Coronation of the Virgin with Six Angels (c. 1390), tempera on panel, National Gallery of Art, Samuel H. Kress Collection, Washington, D.C.. This painting is probably the central panel of an altarpiece, possibly from the church of San Giovanni dei Fieri, Pisa.
- The Crucifixion (c. 1390) tempera and gold on panel. Thyssen-Bornemisza Museum, Madrid
- Madonna of Humility with Angels (mid 1390s), tempera on panel, Cummer Museum of Art and Gardens, Jacksonville, Florida
- Madonna and Child with Angels and Saints, tempera on panel, Palazzo Blu collection
- Crucifixion (1390s), tempera on panel. Part of a polyptych. Galleria degli Uffizi, Florence.
- Histories of the Virgin and the Cintola, Prato Cathedral

== Gallery ==
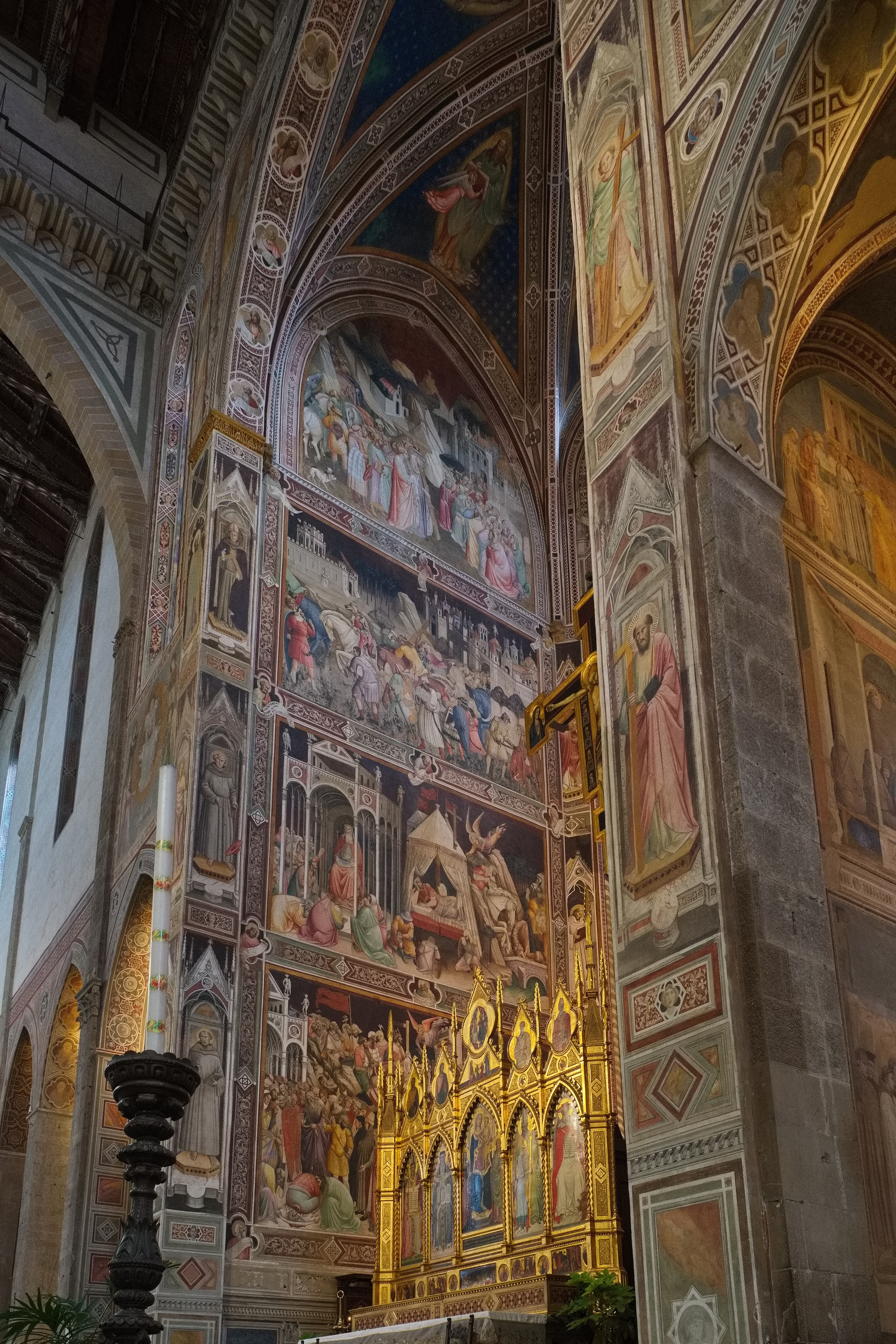
Legend of the True Cross, 1385-1387, north wall of the apse, Santa Croce, Florence

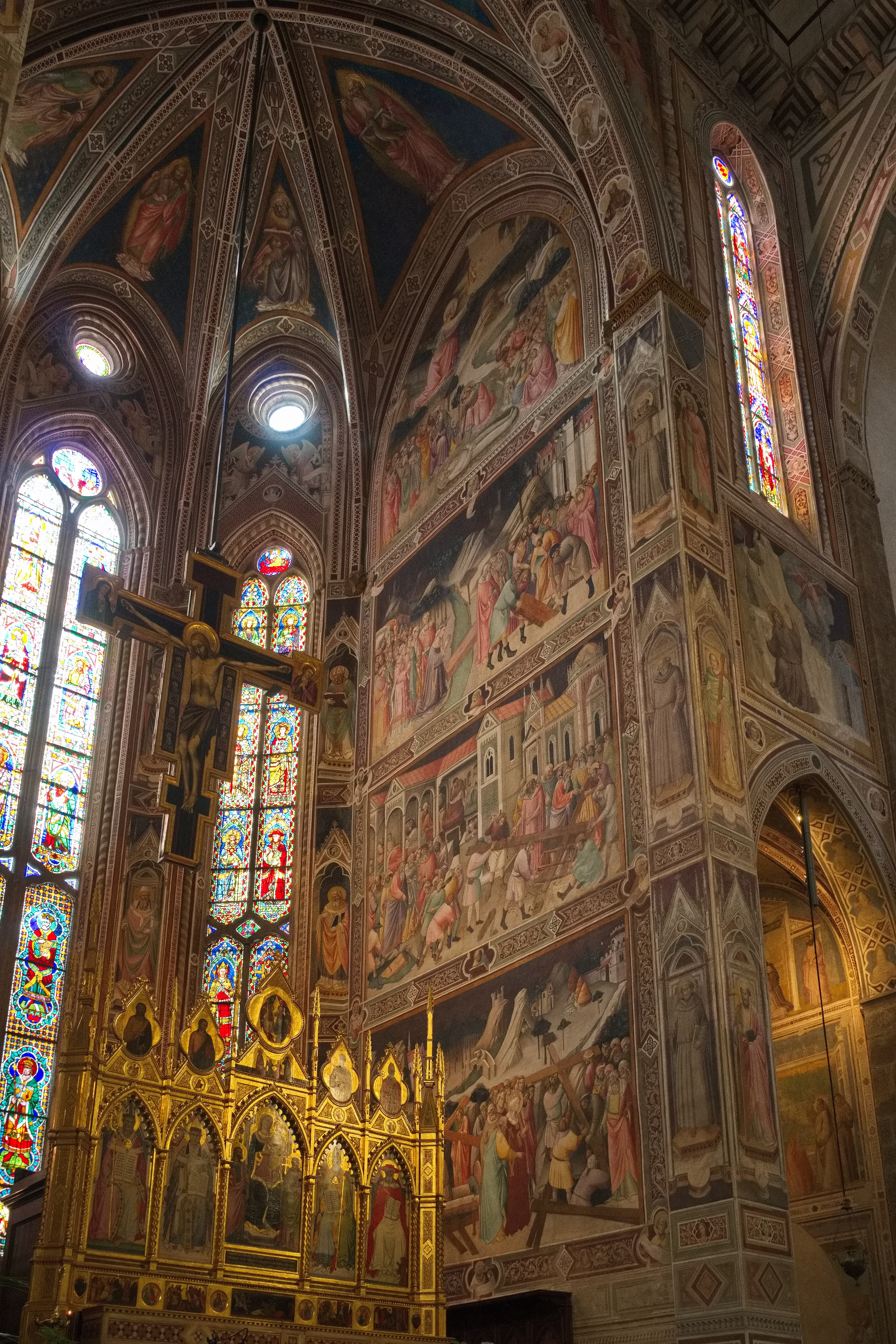
Legend of the True Cross, 1385-1387, south wall of the apse, Santa Croce, Florence

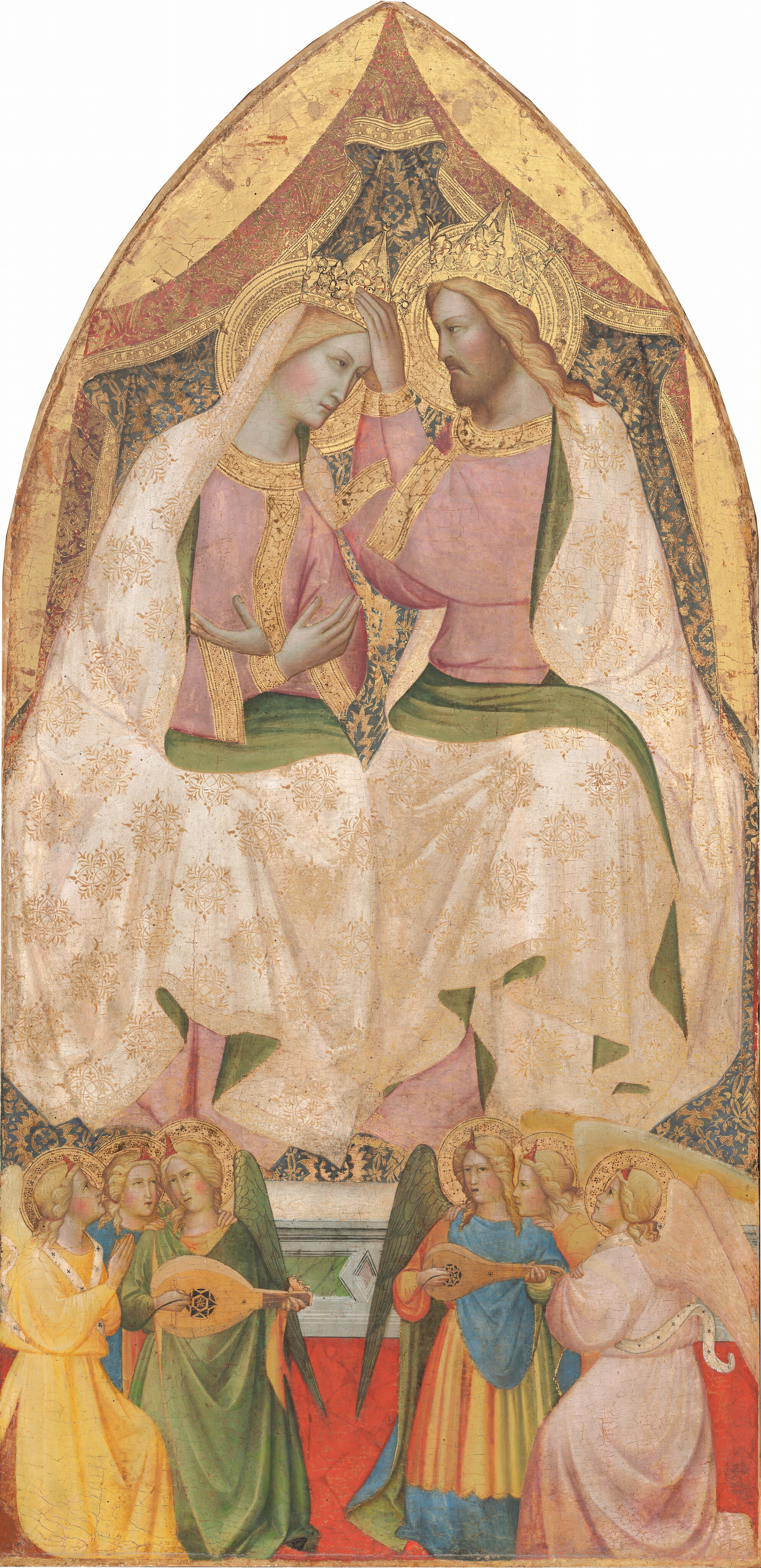
Coronation of the Virgin with Six Angels, c. 1390, tempera on panel, National Gallery of Art
