= Taddeo Gaddi =

Italian painter and architect (c. 1290–1366)

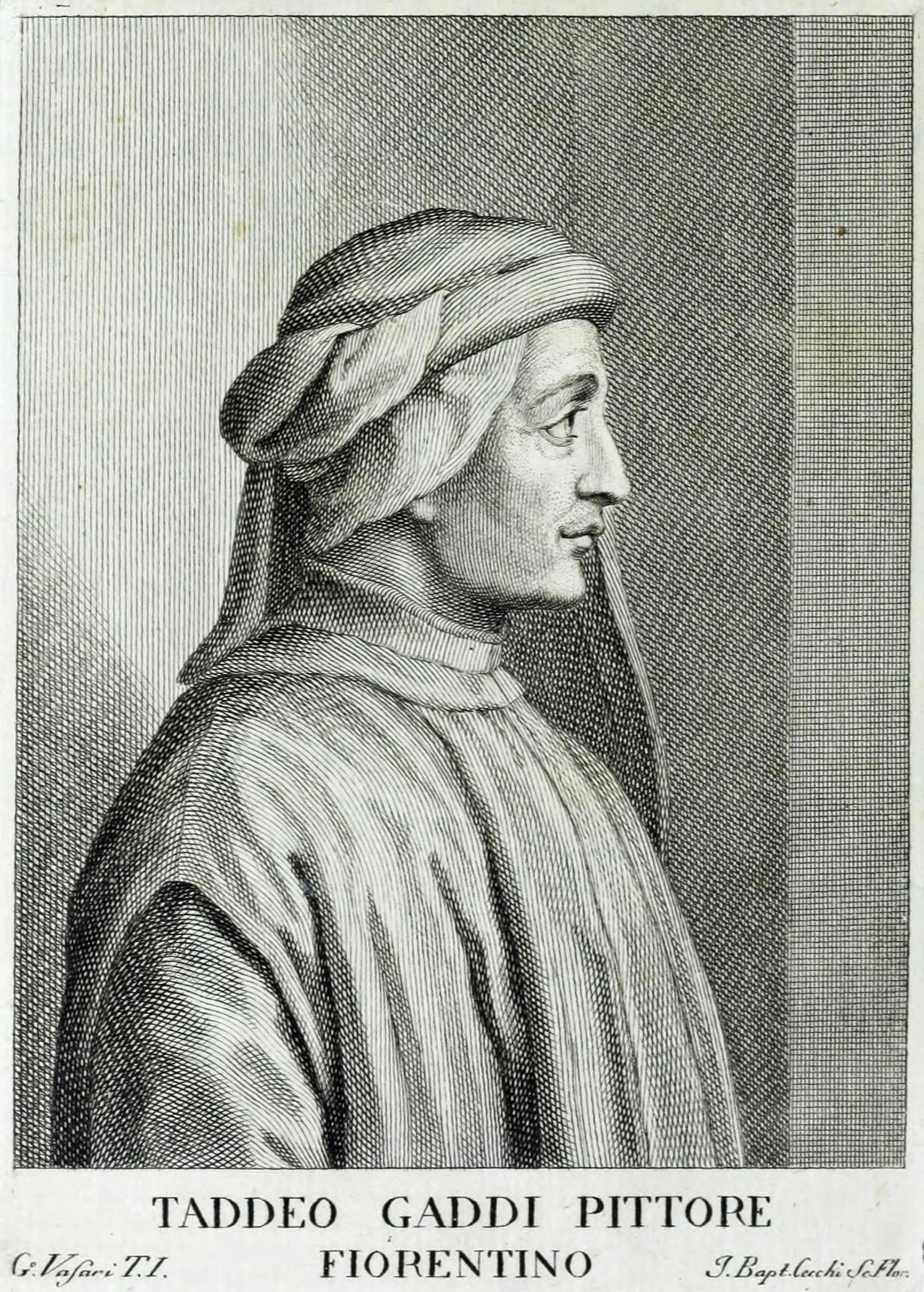
Imaginary portrait of Gaddi (18th century)

Taddeo Gaddi (c. 1290 – 1366) was a medieval Italian painter and architect.

He was born in Florence. He was the son of the painter Gaddo di Zanobi, called Gaddo Gaddi. He was a member of Giotto's workshop from 1313 until the master's death in 1337. According to Giorgio Vasari, he was considered Giotto's most talented pupil: in 1347 he was placed at the top in a list of Florence's most renowned painters. He also traded as a merchant and had a branch establishment in Venice. As well as a painter, he was a mosaicist and architect.

Gaddi's main work is the cycle of Stories of the Virgin in the Baroncelli Chapel of the Basilica of Santa Croce in Florence (1328–1338). Later he perhaps painted the cabinet tiles in the sacristy of the same church, now divided among the Galleria dell'Accademia of Florence and museums in Munich and Berlin. These works show his mastery of Giotto's new style, to which he added personal experimentation in the architectural backgrounds, such as in the staircase of the Presentation of the Virgin in the Baroncelli Chapel.

According to some scholars, he collaborated in the Stefaneschi Polyptych in Rome. His other works include a Madonna in Bern, an Adoration of the Magi in Dijon, the Stories of Job (Pisa, Camposanto Monumentale), the Madonna Enthroned with Child, Angels and Saints (Florence, Uffizi Gallery), The Stigmatization of Saint Francis (Cambridge, MA, Harvard Art Museums), the Madonna del Parto (Florence), and the Polyptych in Santa Felicita's sacristy, Florence. Barcelona's MNAC keeps, as a permanent loan from the Thyssen-Bornemisza Museum in Madrid, a small tempera panel dated 1325, a Nativity that was part of a larger table. Vasari also credited him with the design and reconstruction of the Ponte Vecchio, which is however disputed by modern scholars.

He was the father of Agnolo Gaddi and Giovanni Gaddi.

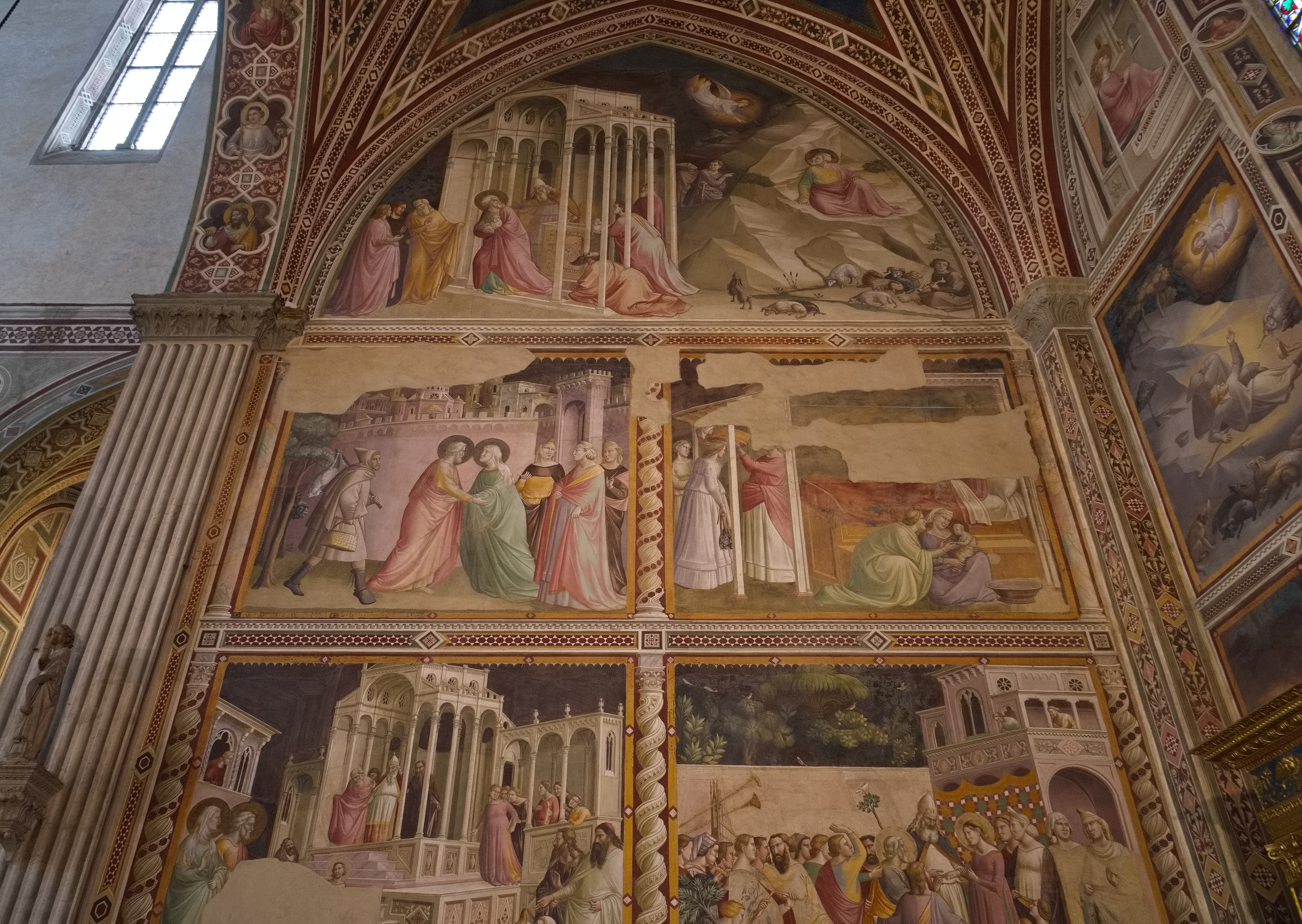
Stories of the Virgin (north wall), c. 1330, Baroncelli Chapel, Santa Croce, Florence

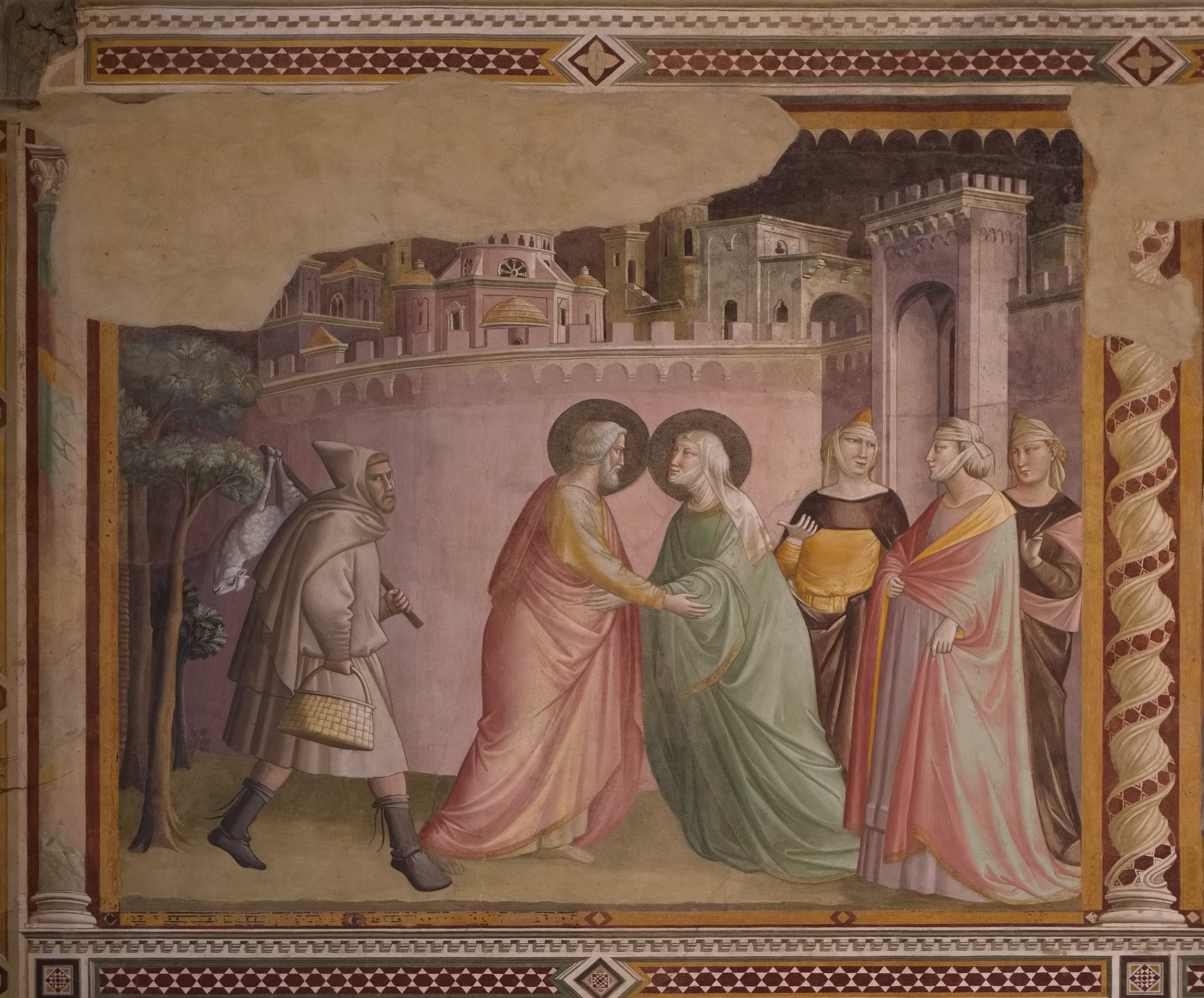
Visitation, c. 1330, Baroncelli Chapel

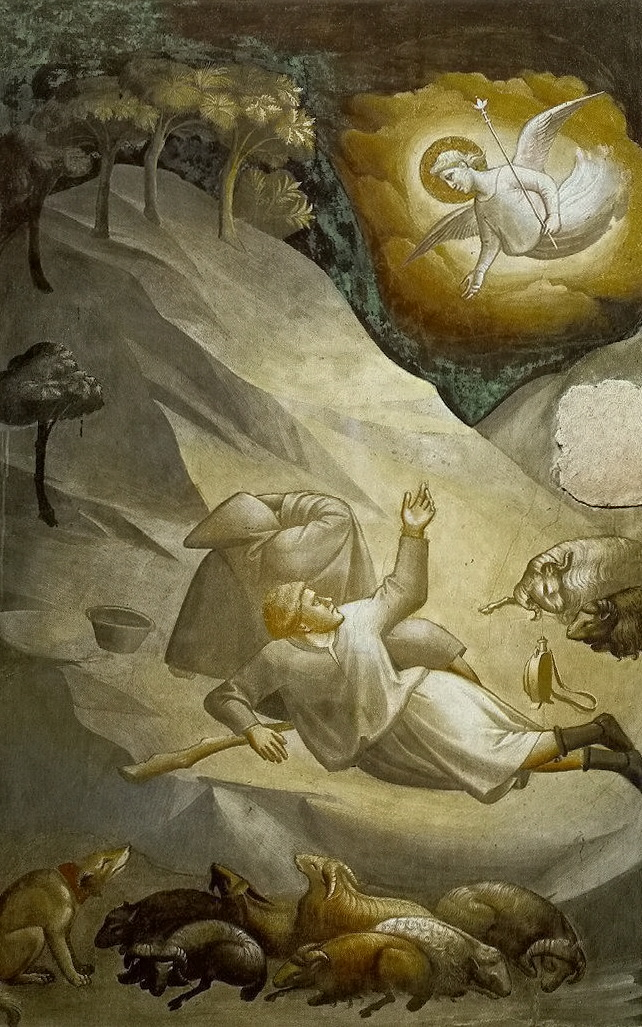
Annunciation to the Shepherds, c. 1330, Baroncelli Chapel

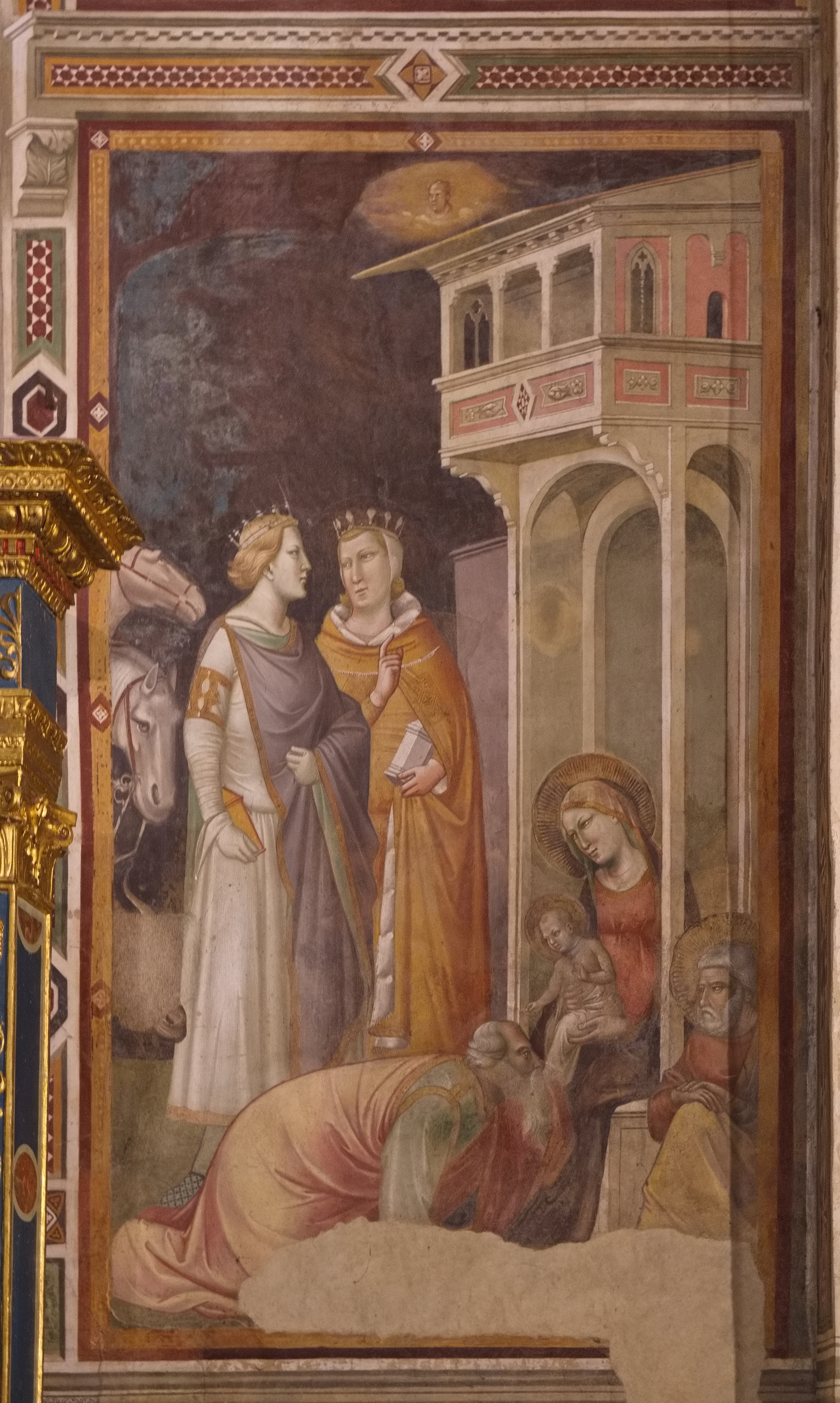
Adoration of the Magi, c. 1330, Baroncelli Chapel

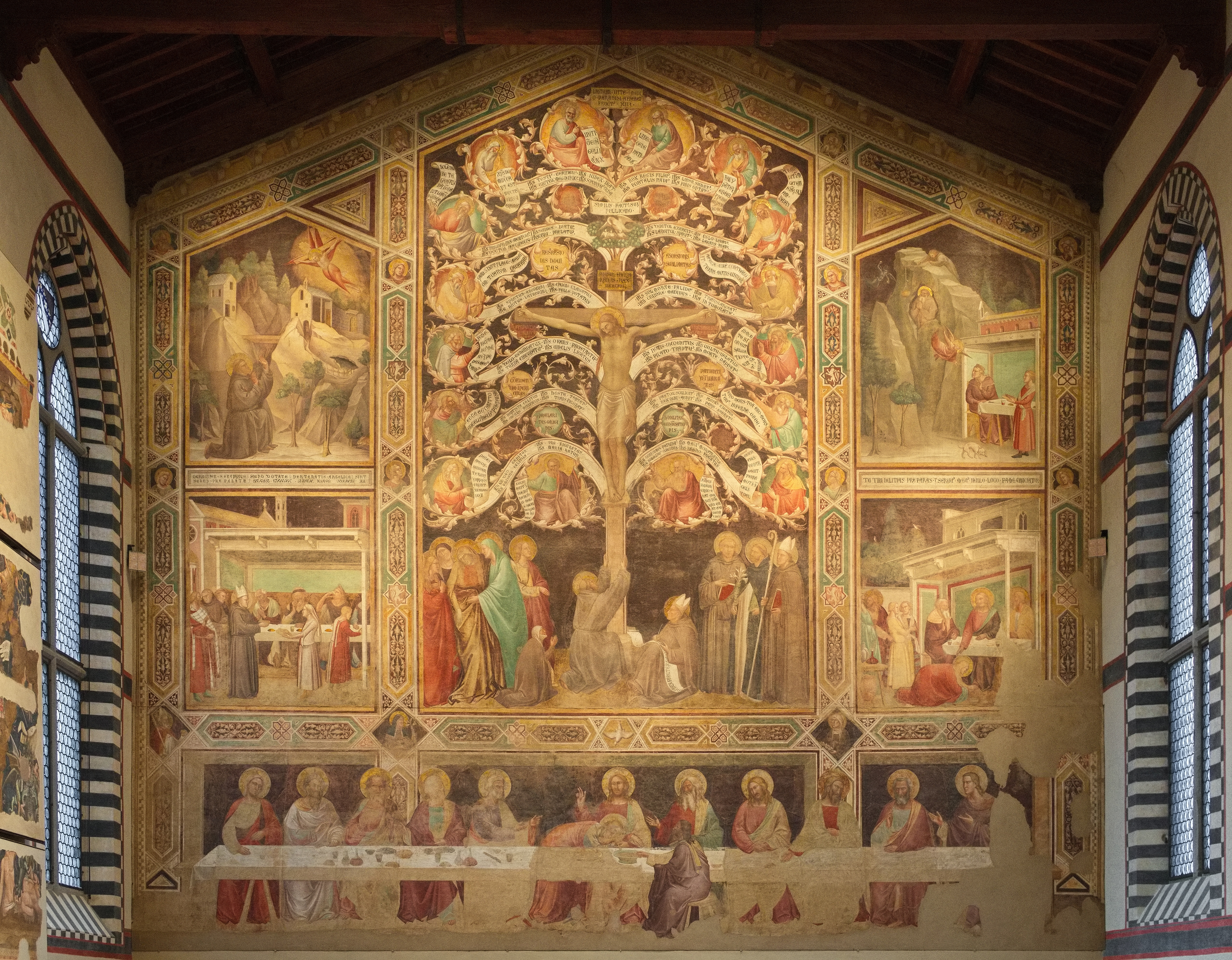
Arbor vitae, c. 1330–40 or 1360, Santa Croce Refectory

== Sources ==
- "Agnolo, Giovanni and Taddeo Gaddi". Catholic Encyclopedia.
- "Gaddi, Taddeo". Web Gallery of Art.
- "The Angelic Announcement to the Shepherds". Web Gallery of Art.
