= Anonimo Gaddiano =

Author of 16th-century notes on Florentine artists

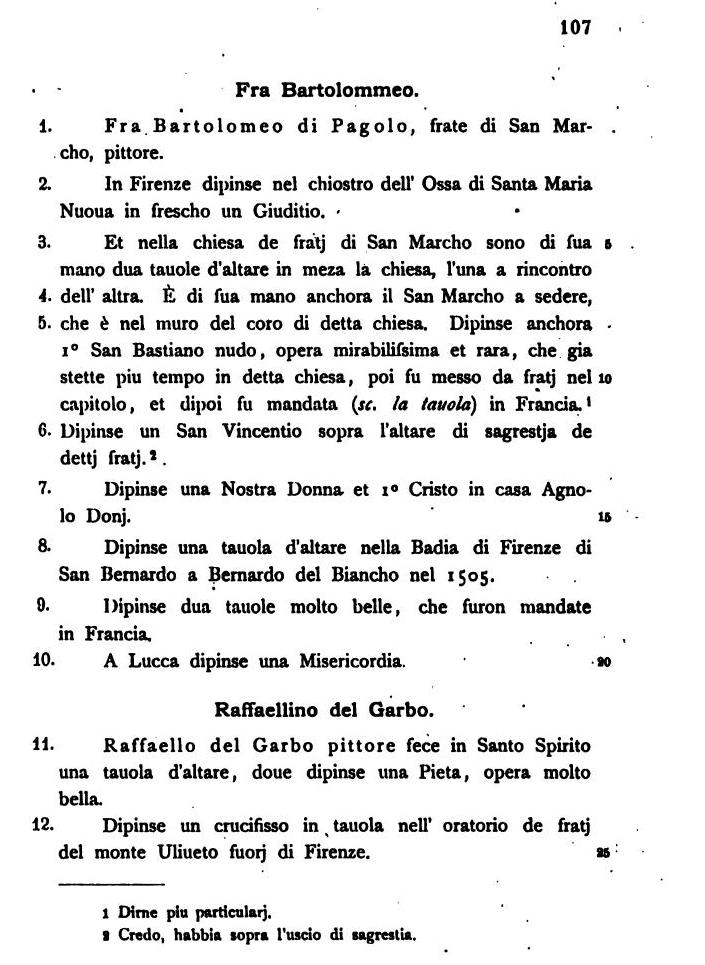
Page from the 1892 printed transcript, with the full notes on Fra Bartolomeo and Raffaellino del Garbo

An anonymous author known as the Anonimo Gaddiano, Anonimo Magliabechiano, or Anonimo Fiorentino ("the anonymous Florentine") is the author of the Codice Magliabechiano, a manuscript with 128 pages of text, probably from the 1530s and 1540s, and now in the Central National Library of Florence (Magliab. XVII, 17). It includes brief biographies and notes on the works of Italian artists, mainly those active in Florence during the Middle Ages. Among several other suggestions, the anonymous author has been suggested to be Bernardo Vecchietti (1514–1590), a politician of the court of Cosimo I. The author clearly had intimate access to the Medici court.

The manuscript dates from about 1536 to the mid 1540s and is considered a useful source for the study of the history of Italian art since it is the most comprehensive biographical source for artists before the 1550 edition of Vasari's Lives, which was being compiled over the same period. It is not to be confused with the Aztec Codex Magliabechiano in the same library.

While the opening section is devoted to artists from ancient Greece, essentially reprising Pliny the Elder, the most significant part is dedicated to Florentine artists from Cimabue to Michelangelo. The entries for artists concentrate on lists of works, and lack the full biographical ambition of Vasari.

== Contents ==
The manuscript, which now appears to be incomplete, is considered a particularly useful source for the study of the history of Italian art since it is the most comprehensive biographical source before the 1550 edition of Vasari's Lives, which was being compiled over the same period.

The account of the life of Leonardo da Vinci is especially detailed, and much used by later authors. One particular point, a later addition to the manuscript, has been much discussed. This states that Leonardo painted a portrait from life of "Piero Francesco del Giocondo" (or possibly just "Francesco del Giocondo"), respectively the son and the husband of Lisa del Giocondo, usually considered the sitter for the Mona Lisa. Frank Zöllner argues that the author of the note simply made a mistake, and was referring to the Mona Lisa.

In general, much of the information is the same as in Vasari's Lives, though there are also distinct differences. It is clear the two authors knew each other, but not clear that either had read the other's work. Annotations in the MS include notes to ask Vasari for further details, and it is possible that a satirical portrait at the end of the MS records the author's bitterness when he realized that Vasari's publication would eclipse his own efforts, or had already done so. Like Vasari, the author had access to a version of the material known from the somewhat earlier manuscript of Antonio Billi, from about 1515, which may have been circulated among Florentine art lovers in various redactions.

== Provenance ==
Bernardo Vecchietti, one possible author, was the son of a rich cloth merchant and would only have been in his early twenties when he compiled the manuscript in the early 1540s. He was later a patron of the sculptor Giambologna, and helped Duke Cosimo organize his artistic projects, in 1572 provoking bitter complaints by Vasari, surviving in a letter to Vincenzo Borghini (another figure suggested as the Anonimo Gaddiano).

The manuscript later belonged to the Gaddi family (hence the "Gaddiano" name), descended from the 13th-century artist Gaddo Gaddi, and by the 16th century prominent in banking and the church. Contemporary members included Cardinals Niccolò Gaddi and Taddeo Gaddi, and the priest Giovanni Gaddi, the last a courtier in Florence at the time, and friend of Vasari and Benvenuto Cellini. It entered the collection of Antonio Magliabechi, which became the core of the Florentine public library.

The manuscript was forgotten about until published in 1892 by Karl Frey; altogether the manuscript has been published three times in Italian.

== Artists mentioned or profiled ==
These are the artists covered, in the order of their listing, which is broadly chronological. The transcript edited by Frey is fully available online.

- Cimabue
- Gaddo Gaddi
- Andrea Tafi
- Giotto
- Stefano Fiorentino
- Taddeo Gaddi
- Maso Fiorentino (Maso di Banco)
- Bernardo Daddi
- Pietro Cavallini
- Jacopo del Casentino
- Buonamico Buffalmacco
- Giottino
- Andrea Orcagna
- Agnolo Gaddi
- Antonio Veneziano
- Giovanni da Santo Stefano (Giovanni dal Ponte)
- Gherardo Starnina
- Filippo Brunelleschi
- Lorenzo Ghiberti
- Donatello
- Luca della Robbia
- Antonio del Pollaiuolo
- Masaccio
- Masolino
- Lippo (Lippo Memmi?)
- Ambrogio Lorenzetti
- Simone Martini
- Taddeo di Bartolo
- Giovanni d'Asciano (Giovanni di Guido da Asciano)
- Vecchietta
- Sano pittore (Sano di Pietro)
- Francesco di Giorgio Martini
- Matteo pittore (Matteo di Giovanni)
- Benvenuto pittore (Benvenuto di Giovanni)
- Neroccio pittore (Neroccio di Bartolomeo de' Landi)
- Duccio di Buoninsegna
- Giovanni Pisano
- Andrea Pisano
- Michelozzo
- Desiderio da Settignano
- Andrea del Verrocchio
- Giovanni Francesco Toscani
- Lorenzo di Bicci
- Bicci di Lorenzo
- Neri di Bicci
- Nanni di Banco
- Antonio Rossellino and Bernardo Rossellino
- Giovanni dal Ponte
- Fra Giovanni da Fiesole (Fra Angelico)
- Lorenzo Monaco
- Dello Delli
- Spinello Aretino
- Filippo Lippi
- Andrea del Castagno
- Paolo Uccello
- Giuliano Pesello
- Francesco Pesellino
- Alesso Baldovinetti
- Domenico Veneziano
- Zanobi Strozzi
- Zanobi Machiavelli
- Baccio da Montelupo
- Benozzo Gozzoli
- Piero del Pollaiuolo
- Sandro Botticelli
- Domenico Ghirlandaio
- Fra Bartolomeo
- Raffaellino del Garbo
- Andrea del Sarto
- Leonardo da Vinci
- Michelangelo Buonarroti
- Cosimo Rosselli
- Pietro Perugino
- Luca Signorelli
- Filippino Lippi
- Francia Bigio
