= Gaddo =

Gaddo is a Florentine variation of the Italian given name Gerardo (Gerard).

== Famous persons with the given name Gaddo ==
1. Gaddo Gaddi Florentine painter and mosaicist (c. 1250–1327/30?)
2. Gaddo della Gherardesca Tuscan aristocrat, formerly associated romantically with Sarah, Duchess of York
3. Gaddo, son of Ugolino della Gherardesca (c. 1220–1289), and who features in Dante's Inferno
