= Pseudo-Hebrew =

Medieval artistic use

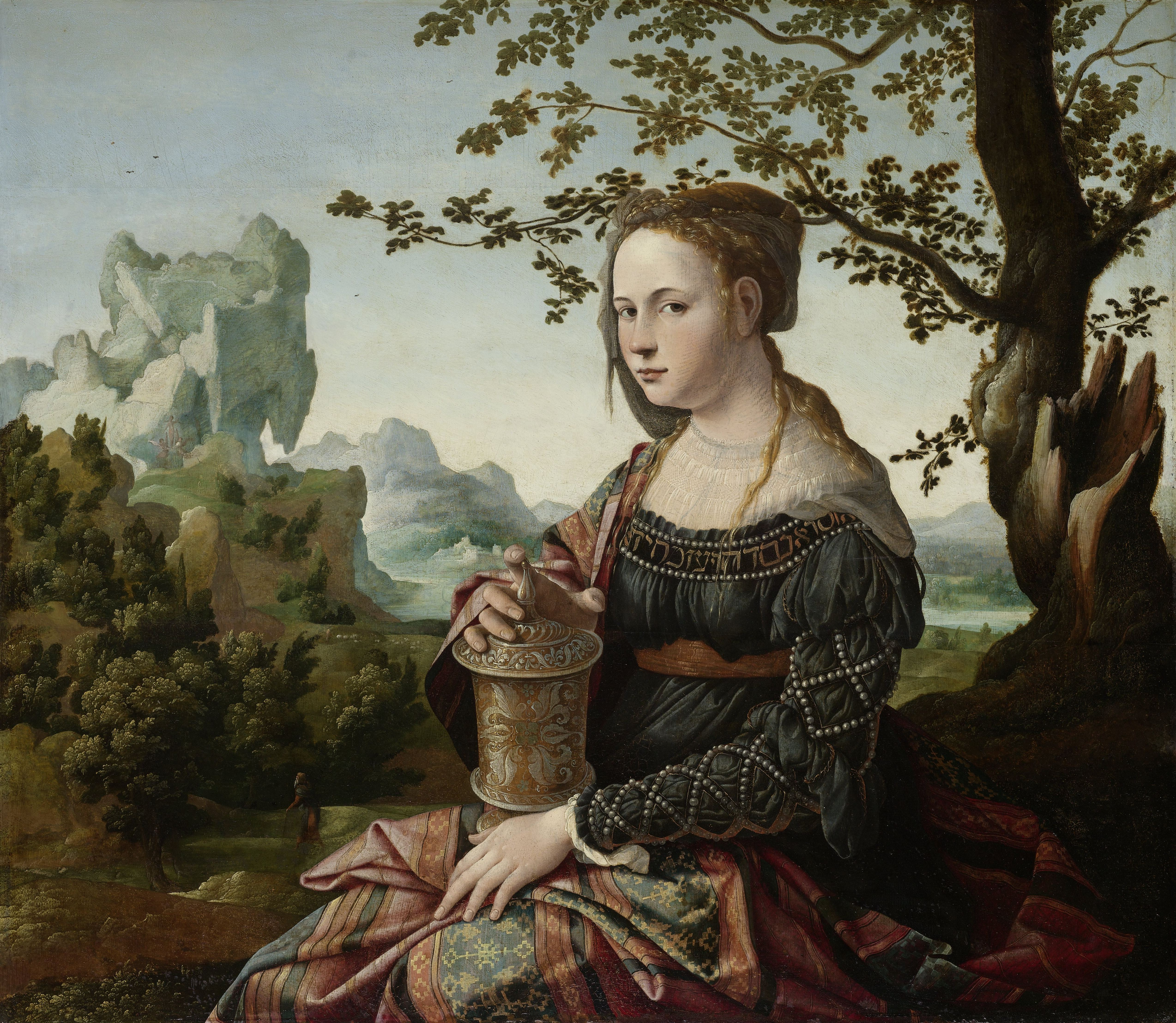
Pseudo-Hebrew script on the bustier of Jan van Scorel's Maria Magdalena, 1530

Pseudo-Hebrew is the artistic use of symbols meant to appear like Hebrew script but that are not in fact Hebrew letters. The related phenomenon of the use of actual Hebrew letters in ways that do not represent actual language may be called "nonsense Hebrew". Gary Schwartz, an art historian, notes that the use of pseudo-Hebrew in 15th-century art is not distinctive, as other works of the time also contain pseudo-Greek, Hebrew, and Latin.

== History ==
In medieval European artworks, faux-Hebrew was used in paintings to identify and portray Jewish people or as a reference to Jewish people, often in a negative light. Following the Renaissance, the frequency of faux-Hebrew increased in artworks and was often used to signify its status as a holy language for Christians.

== See also ==
- Pseudo-Kufic
- Pseudo-runes

== Bibliography ==
- Benner, Gabriela (2019). "El Faux-Hebreo: un alfabeto con errores". Cultura, Espaço & Memória (9): 357–365.
- Leiman, Rivka Elitzur; Leibner, Uzi (2016). "An Amulet from Khirbet Wadi Ḥamam". Israel Exploration Journal. 66 (2): 220–231. ISSN 0021-2059. JSTOR 44474007.
- Menczel, Linda-Saskia (n.d.). "Hebrew Inscriptions in European Art of the 15th–18th Centuries — A Sign of Erudition". Academia.edu. Originally published in Romanian in Caiete de Arte și Design 8 (2020): 58–63. CEEOL 924543
- Resnick, Irven M. (2023). "'Lingua sacra et diabolica': A Survey of Medieval Christian Views of the Hebrew". In Daniel Stein Kokin (ed.). Hebrew Between Jews and Christians. De Gruyter. pp. 67–93. doi:10.1515/9783110339826-004.
- Rodov, Ilia (2013-08-01). "Script in Christian Art". In Khan, Geoffrey (ed.). Encyclopedia of Hebrew Language and Linguistics. Vol. 3. Leiden: Brill. p. 462. ISBN 978-90-04-17642-3. Archived from the original on 2023-04-12.
- Schwartz, Gary (22 November 2010). "Pseudo-Semitism". Art History from Holland.
- Vera, Vicente Jara; Ávila, Carmen Sánchez (February 2017). "Four Versions of the Christus by the Massys: Deciphering the Meaning of the Letters". Religions. 8 (2): 19. doi:10.3390/rel8020019. ISSN 2077-1444.
