= Barna da Siena =

Italian painter

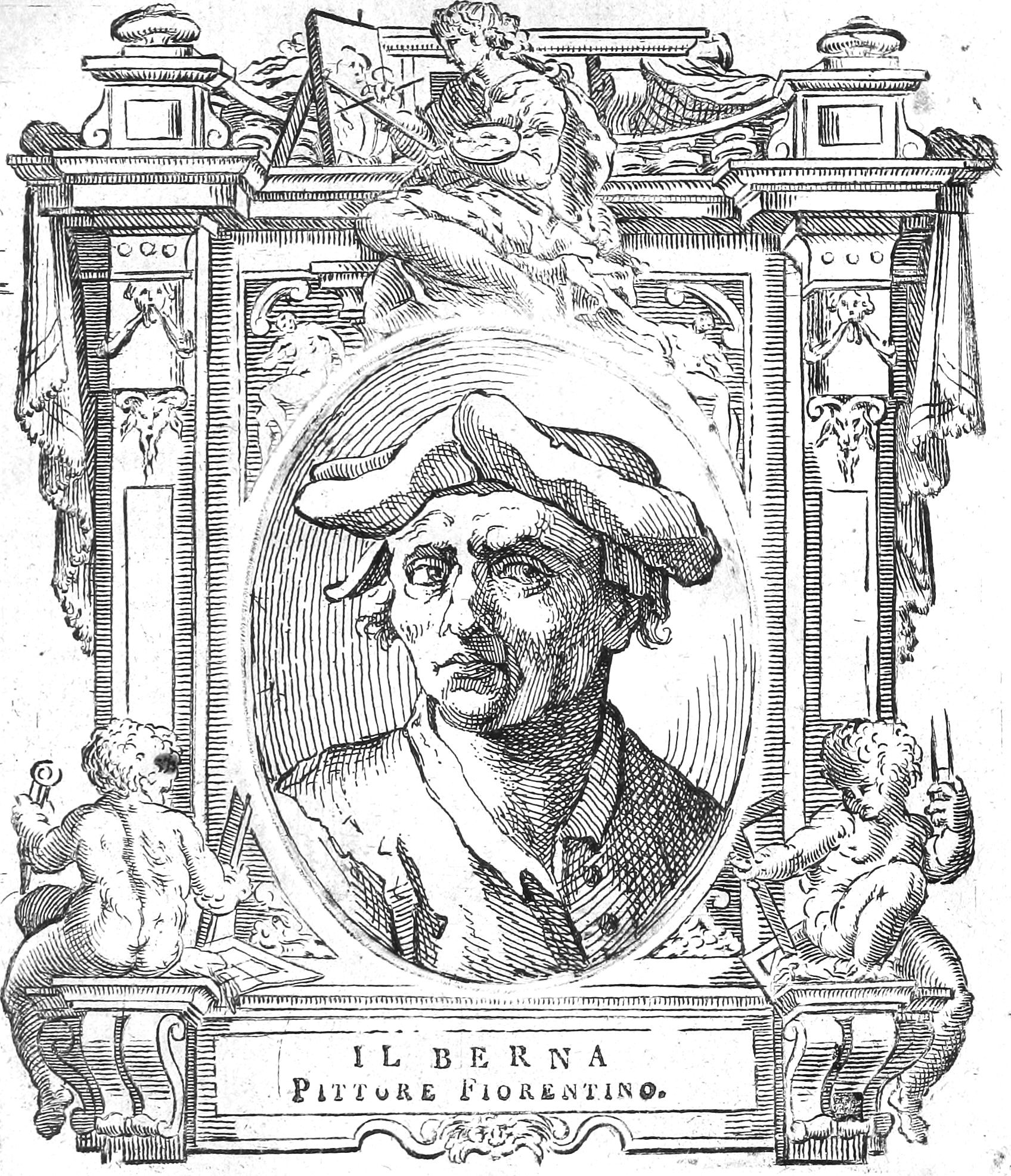
Barna da Siena

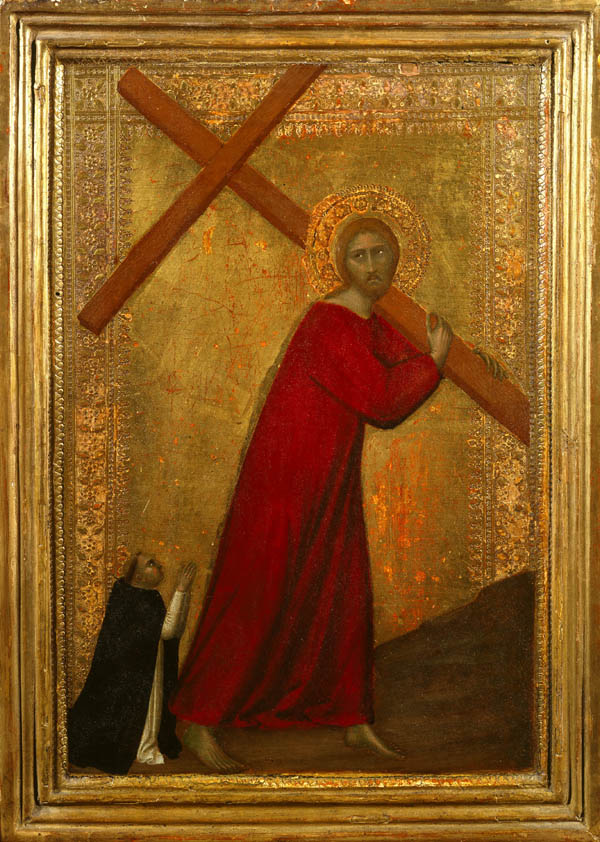
'Christ Bearing the Cross, with a Dominican Friar', tempera on panel, 1330-1350, Frick Collection

Barna da Siena, also known as Berna di Siena, was presumed to be a Sienese painter active from about 1330 to 1350.

The painter was first referred to by Lorenzo Ghiberti in his I Commentarii (mid 15th century) as a Sienese painter who painted several works in Tuscany, including many stories from the Old Testament in San Gimignano. Giorgio Vasari referred in the first edition of his Lives of the Most Excellent Painters, Sculptors, and Architects (1550) to the Sienese painter ‘Berna’ who was responsible for frescos of Old Testament scenes in the Collegiata di San Gimignano. In the second edition of the Vite (1568) Vasari only connected the artist with the New Testament scenes in that church, dating them to the very end of Barna’s life, apparently to 1381.

Because of the wide variations in style and quality in the New Testament paintings in San Gimignano it is believed that they were the work of three or four distinct painters. It is further believed that Vasari's dating of the New Testament scenes was incorrect as on stylistic grounds they should be dated to the period 1330-1340s. Because of these problems with the identification of the artist a majority of scholars now believe that ‘Barna’ is a historical fiction. This conclusion has generated various theories on the authorship of the San Gimignano frescoes. The view is that the Collegiata frescoes and other panel paintings attributed to the artist are all closely linked to the work of followers of Simone Martini and the circle of Lippo Memmi.

== Life ==
Because of a lack of signed works Barna has been credited as the master of the Collegiata di San Gimignano. It is believed that his pupil Giovanni d'Asciano assisted him on the frescoes and finished the left-over portions after Barna reportedly fell from a scaffolding and died supposedly at a young age. It is suggested, based on the works of biographer Giorgio Vasari, that the master working in the Collegiata di San Gimignano was named Bernardo Bertini. Bernardo was notably taken prisoner in 1335 during a skirmish with the Luccans. He later went to Siena and studied in Simone Martini's workshop. Documents show that in 1355 he was either absent from Siena or dead. This supports the notion that Barna, the master of San Gimignano, died fairly young, somewhere around 1360. When captured in 1335 it was noted that he was just a lad. If he was born shortly before 1320 and died somewhere before 1360 then he could not have been older than forty before his death.

== Style of work ==
Though not much is certain about Barna's life, his work is very distinct. He is known for his dramatically expressive figures and using a more close-in composition than his predecessors. His version of The Raising of Lazarus, for example displays far fewer figures than Duccio's version and there is much more emphasis on each subject's emotions and actions. Their expressions are much more dramatic and there is a sense of human-ness that isn't seen in the work of Sienese painters before him. Barna seemingly ignores the Gothic formulae exemplified by Simone Martini and his disciples. Instead his figures feature a sense of volume and emotionalism reminiscent of Florentine painters, further strengthening the claim that Barna was not a native of Siena, but more likely hailed from Florence

== Sources ==
- Cecchi, Emilio, Sienese Painters of the Trecento, London, F. Warne, 1931.
- Ghiberti, Lorenzo, Lorenzo Ghiberti, I commentarii, Biblioteca nazionale centrale di Firenze, Firenze, Giunti, 1998.
- Vasari, Giorgio, Le Vite delle più eccellenti pittori, scultori, ed architettori, many editions and translations.
