= Giovanni d'Asciano =

Italian painter

Giovanni d'Asciano, a pupil of Barna of Siena, is said to have completed the frescoes left unfinished by that master at San Gimignano, Tuscany. At Asciano, his birthplace, there is a work by Giovanni, similar in style to the works of Barna. This painter flourished about 1380.
