= Chapel of Saint John, Pürgg =

Chapter of Saint John
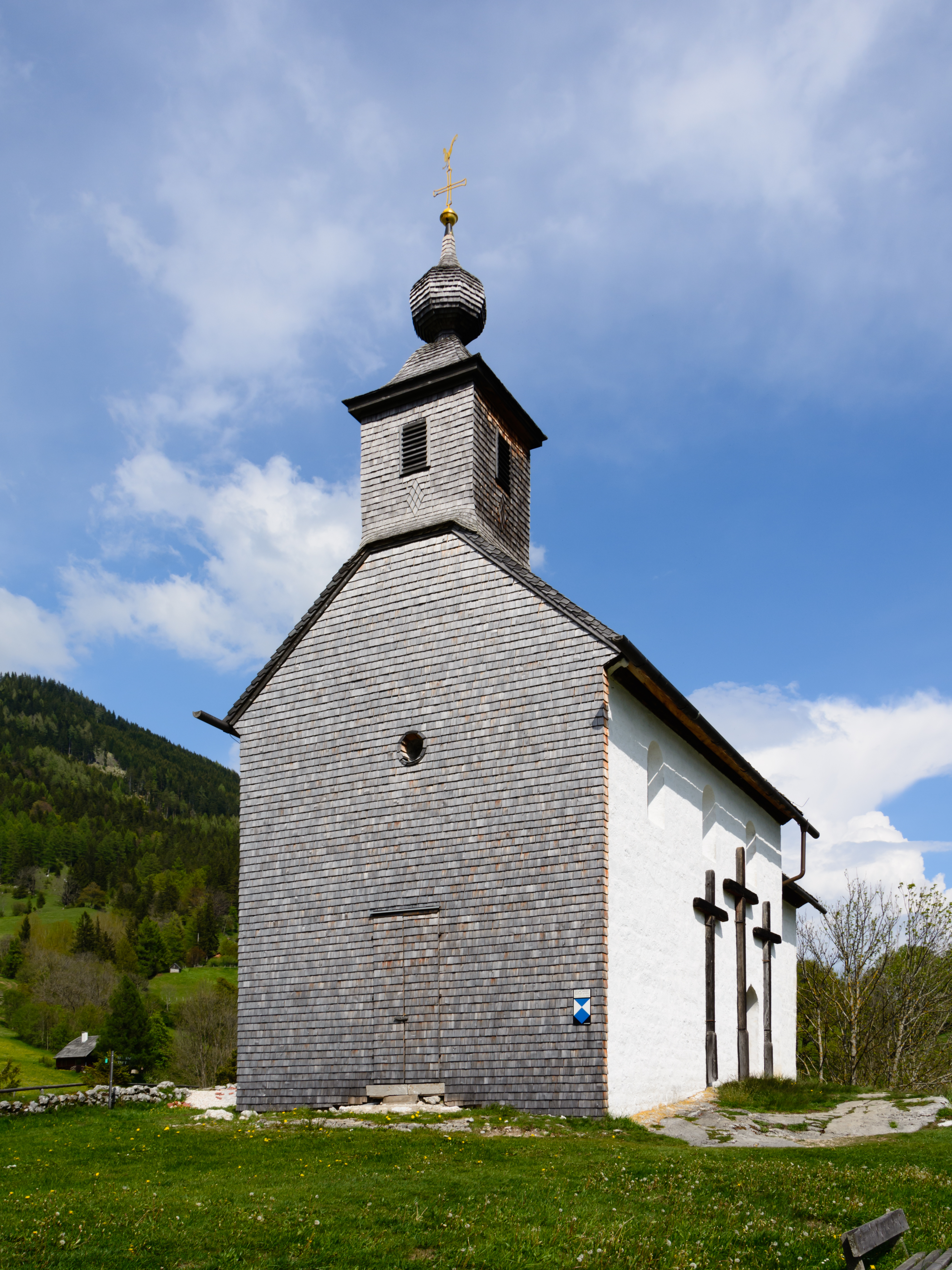
- The main chapel

The Chapel of Saint John (Johanneskapelle) is a renowned Romanesque chapel located in the village of Pürgg, part of the municipality of Stainach-Pürgg in Styria, Austria. It is famous for possessing some of the most well-preserved 12th-century frescoes in Europe. Believed to have been founded as a chapel for the local castle of the Marquesses of Styria in the 12th century, it was later abandoned when the family line died out in 1192. It is a small Romanesque building. In the Baroque era, a small roof turret and three crosses were added to the south wall, as it served as a station on a Way of the Cross (Calvary).

== Frescos ==
Apart from the frescoes, which cover almost the entire interior of the church, the only remaining interior furnishings are a simple altar mensa with a Romanesque crucifix from the parish church of Pürgg . The frescoes date from the third quarter of the 12th century. They are believed to have been commissioned by Margrave Ottokar III of Traungau (1125–1164), who is also thought to be one of the two donor figures depicted to the left and right of the chancel opening. The artists are attributed to the Salzburg school of art, and the paintings reveal their familiarity with Byzantine art . The frescoes are among the best-preserved of their time.

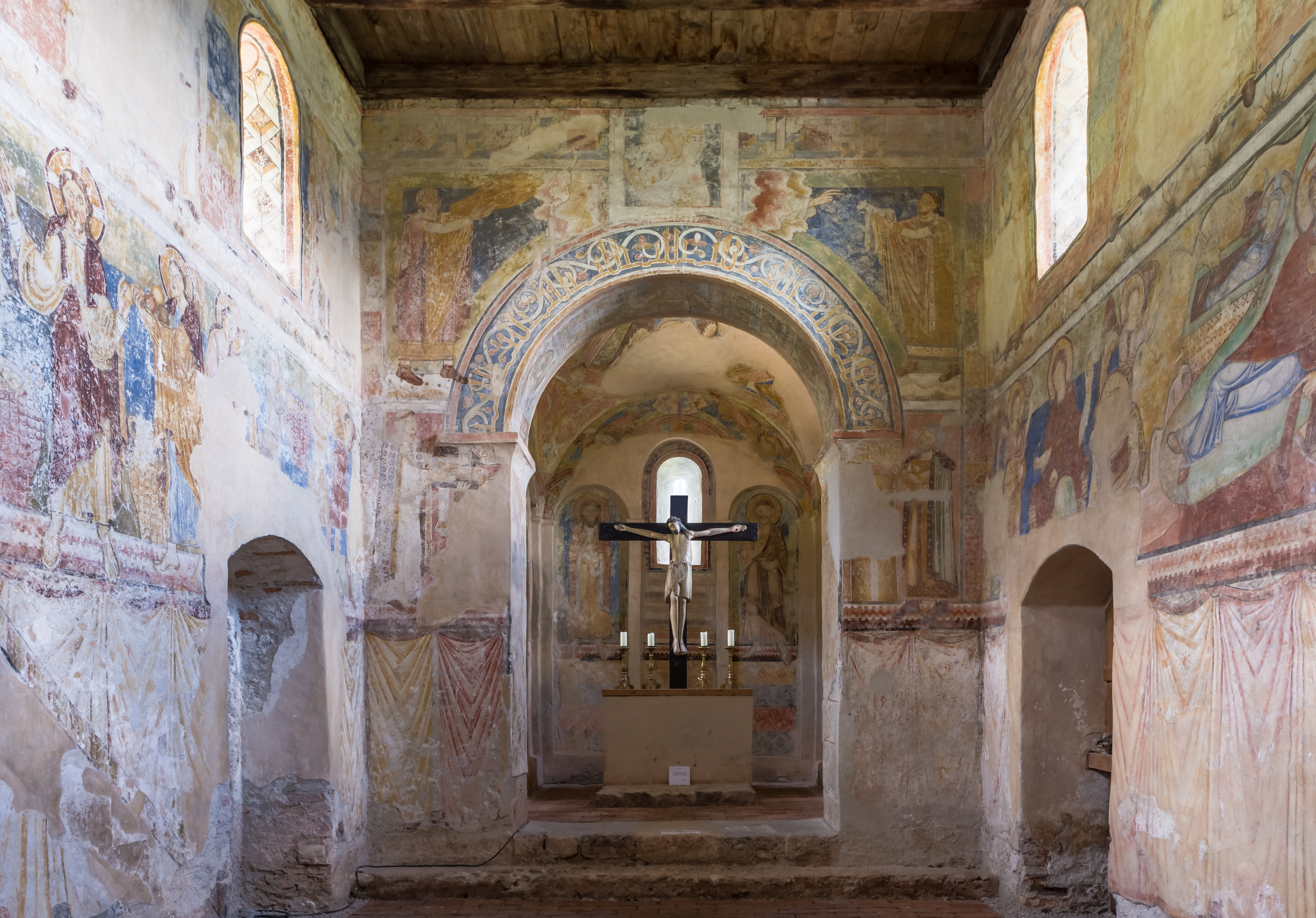
Inside

The base of the frescoes is formed by a painted curtain. Above this is the main band, approximately two meters high, depicting the miracle of the loaves and fishes on the north side and scenes surrounding the birth of Christ on the south side. At the western end is the secular motif of the Cat and Mouse War, based on Aesop's tale . In the upper band, the foolish virgins (north side) are contrasted with the wise virgins (south side). The sacrifices of Cain and Abel are depicted next to the triumphal arch. Within the decorative band around the triumphal arch, the word Allah, the Arabic name for the one God in all monotheistic religions, is repeated several times in Kufic ( ancient Arabic) script, albeit with slight distortion , and surrounded by arabesques .

In the chancel, on the east wall, one can see the patron saints of the church, John the Baptist (left) and John the Evangelist (right), while on the side walls, two holy bishops with regional ties ( Rupert and Virgil ?) and two figures from the Old Testament with crowns and scrolls ( David and Melchizedek ?) face each other. In the four segments of the chancel's shallow vault, the symbols of the Evangelists— bull, lion, eagle, and man—are found alongside the central depiction of Christ as the Lamb with a cruciform halo and banner.

Throughout the church interior, the figurative scenes are enriched by diverse ornamental decorations. Mostly arranged in stripes, the ornamentation often imitates marble and fabric patterns or forms plant motifs or purely geometric shapes.

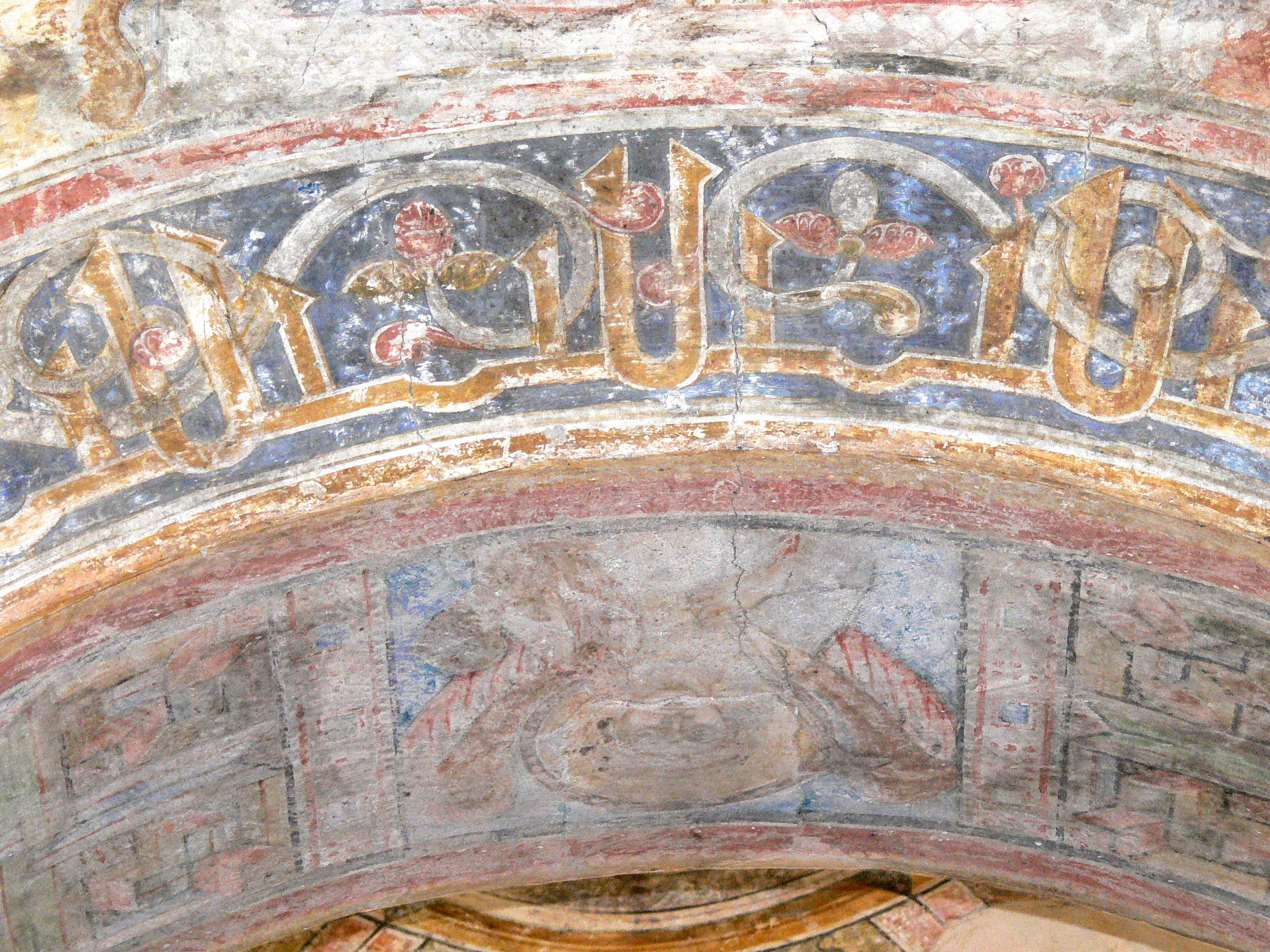
Psudo Arabic on an arch
