= Giovanni di Francesco Toscani =

Italian painter

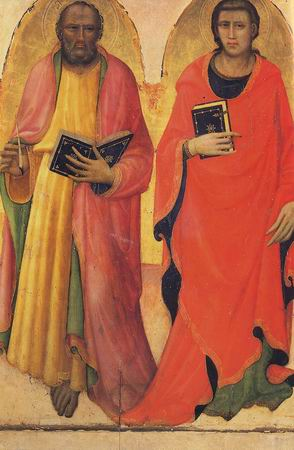
Sts. Matthew and John, Museo dell'Opera del Duomo, Prato.

Giovanni di Francesco Toscani (1372 - 2 May 1430) was an Italian painter.

Born in Florence, he was the pupil of Giottino, in whose style he painted. His masterpiece is said to have been an Annunciation for a chapel of the Bishop's palace in Arezzo. It was restored by Agnolo di Lorenzo, and later by Vasari. Toscani was buried in Santa Maria del Fiore.
