= Stefano Fiorentino =

Italian painter

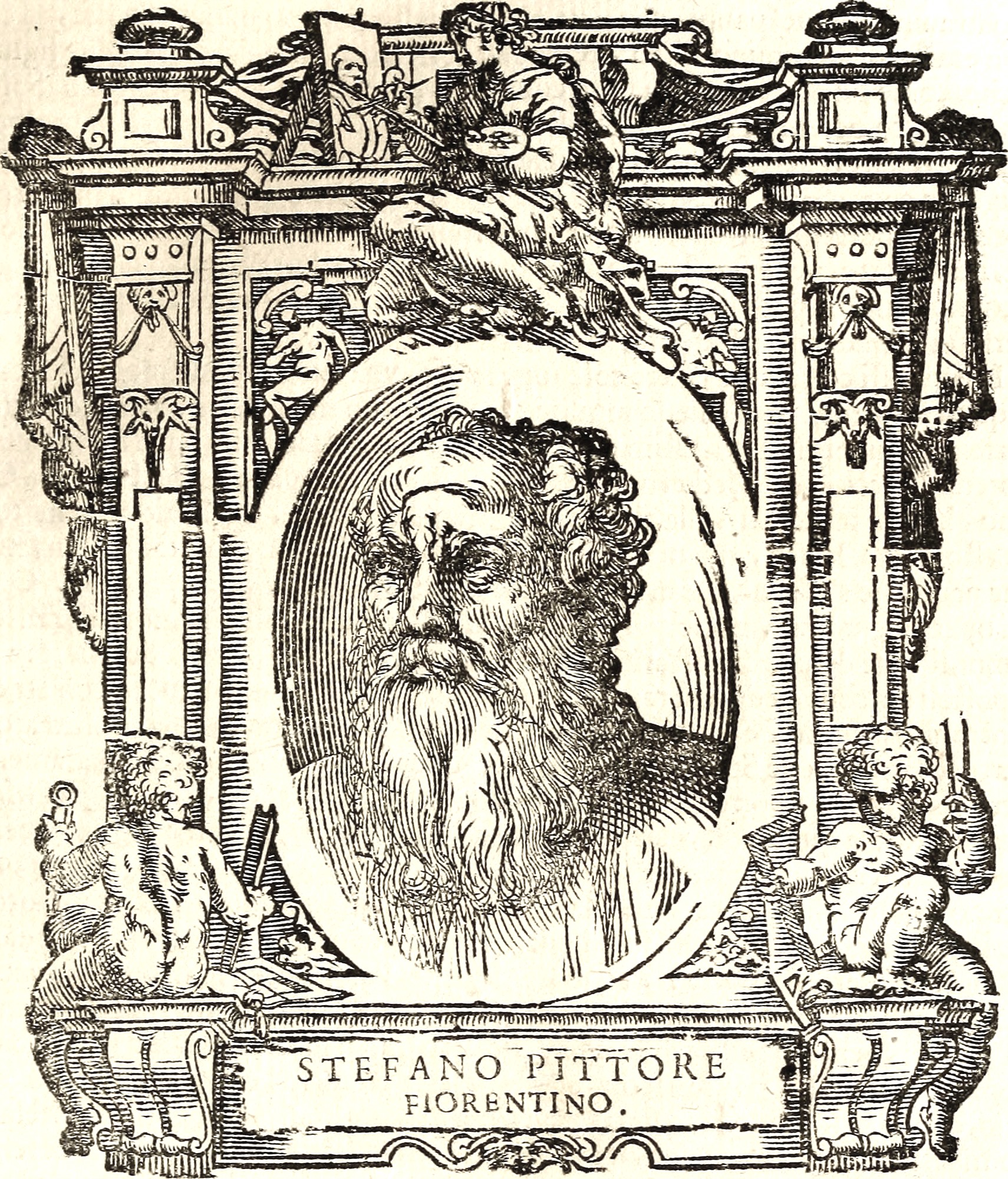
"Stefano Pittor, Fiorentina", an imaginary portrait from Vasari's Vite

Stefano Fiorentino (1301–1350) was an Italian painter of the time of Giotto.

Born in Florence, he is mentioned in numerous literary sources, most notably the Lives of the Artists by Giorgio Vasari; other writers in whose works he appears include Franco Sacchetti and Filippo Villani. No painting of his is known with any certainty to survive. Some of the frescoes in the Cistercian abbey of Chiaravalle, near Milan, were attributed to Stefano and his studio in 2010.

He died in Florence in 1350. His more famous son was nicknamed "Giottino" in admiring reference to his Giottesque realism.
