= Giottino =

Italian painter

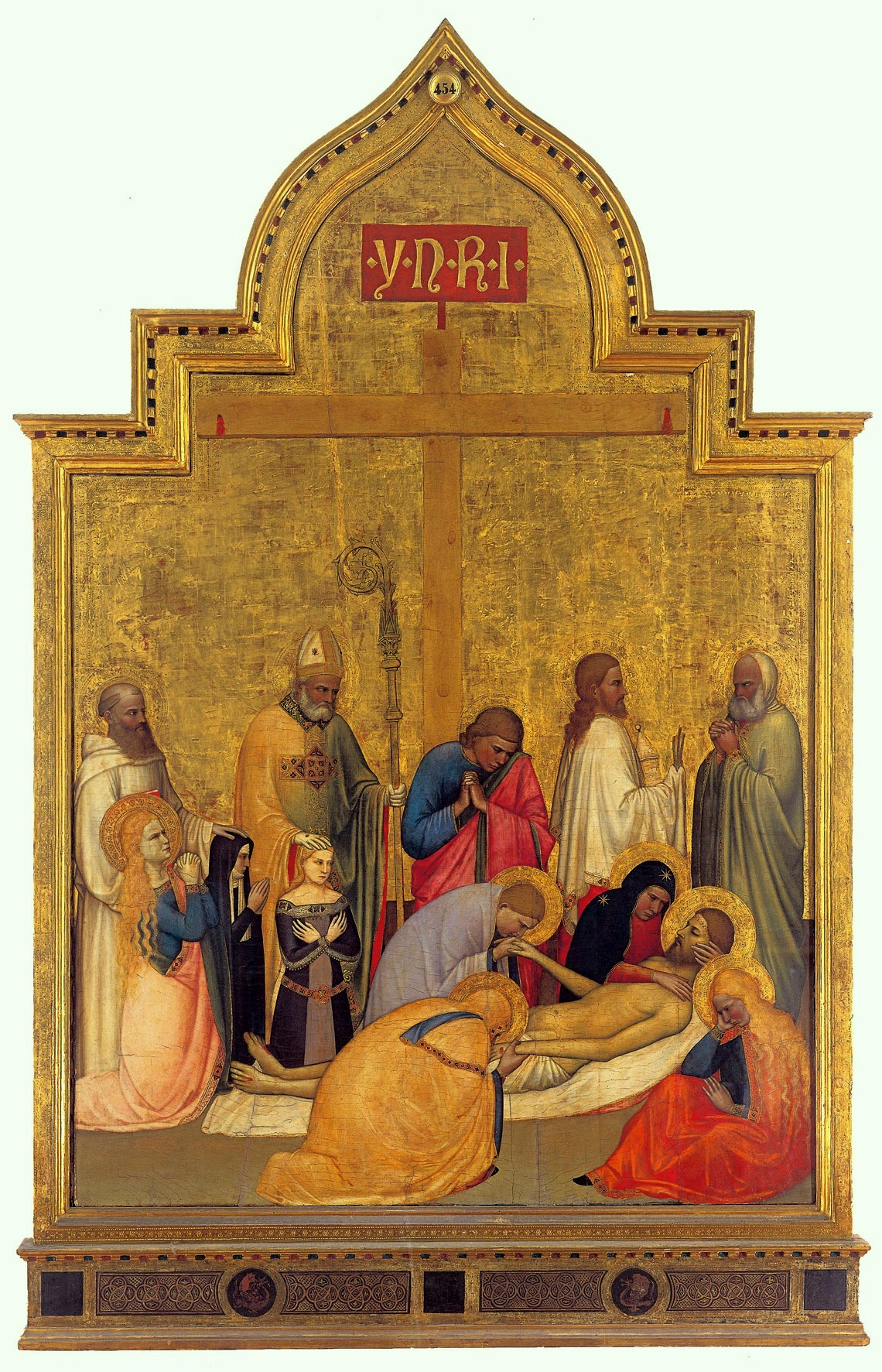
Pietà of San Remigio. ca. 1365, tempera on wood, 195 x 134 cm, Galleria degli Uffizi, Florence

Giottino (fl. 1324 – 1369), also known as Tommaso Fiorentino, was an early Italian painter from Florence. His real name was Maso di Stefano or Tommaso di Stefano.

Giottino's father, Maestro Stefano Fiorentino, "Stefano the Florentine", was a celebrated painter in the school of Giotto whose naturalism earned him the appellation "Scimmia della Natura", the "Ape of Nature", for his perceived realism. Stefano instructed his son while Maso was studying the works of the great Giotto. Since Maso formed his style on Giotto's works, he became known as Giottino, the "little Giotto".

The frescoes in the chapel of San Silvestro in the Florentine Basilica of Santa Croce are attributed to Giottino. These frescoes represent the miracles of Pope Sylvester as narrated in the Golden Legend.

Many other works have been attributed to Giottino including Apparition of the Virgin to St. Bernard and a marble statue erected on the Florentine campanile. Works by Giottino are in the Uffizi Gallery in Florence.

Giorgio Vasari, the chronicler of the Italian Renaissance, includes a biography of Giottino in the second part of his famous Lives of the Most Excellent Painters, Sculptors, and Architects (Le Vite de' più eccellenti pittori, scultori, e architettori da Cimabue insino a' tempi nostri).
