= Gaddo Gaddi =

Italian painter and mosaicist of Florence (c. 1239–c. 1312)

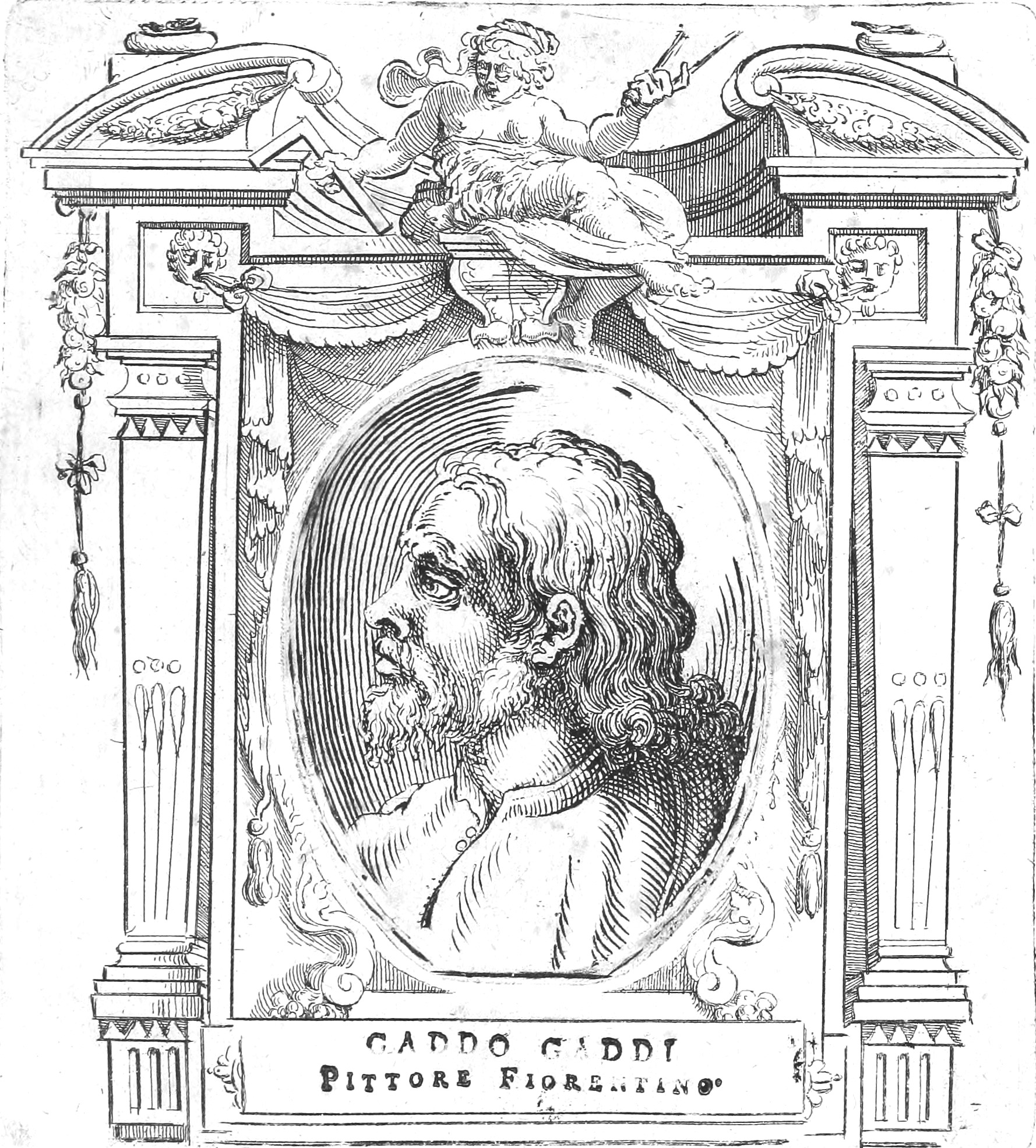
Illustration of Gaddo Gaddi for The Lives, by Giorgio Vasari, 1568

Gaddo Gaddi (c. 1239, Florence – c. 1312, Florence) was a painter and mosaicist of Florence in a Gothic art style. Almost no works survive. He was the father of Taddeo Gaddi. He completed mosaics on the facade of Santa Maria Maggiore in Rome. The "Coronation of the Virgin" mosaic over the inside door of Florence Cathedral, dated 1307, is also attributed to Gaddo Gaddi.

Gaddo Gaddi was, according to Vasari, an intimate friend of Cimabue, and afterwards of Giotto. His dates of birth and death have been given as 1239 and about 1312; these are probably too early; he may have been born towards 1260, and may have died in or about 1333.

He was a painter and mosaicist, is said to have executed the great mosaic inside the portal of Florence Cathedral, representing the Coronation of the Virgin, and may with more certainty be credited with the mosaics inside the portico of the basilica of Santa Maria Maggiore, Rome, relating to the legend of the foundation of that church; their date is probably 1308.

In Old Saint Peter's in Rome he also executed the mosaics of the choir, and those of the front representing on a colossal scale God the Father, with many other figures; likewise an altarpiece in the church of Santa Maria Novella, Florence; these works no longer exist. It is usually thought that no picture (as distinct from mosaics) by Gaddo Gaddi is now extant.

Crowe & Cavalcaselle consider that the mosaics of Santa Maria Maggiore bear so strong a resemblance in style to four of the frescoes in the upper church of Assisi, representing incidents in the life of St Francis (frescoes 2, 3, 4 and especially 5, which shows Francis stripping himself, and protected by the bishop), that those frescoes likewise may, with considerable confidence, be ascribed to Gaddi. Some other extant mosaics are attributed to him, but without full authentication. This artist laid the foundation of a very large fortune, which continued increasing, and placed his progeny in a highly distinguished worldly position.

== Sources ==
- Farquhar, Maria (1855). Ralph Nicholson Wornum (ed.). Biographical catalogue of the principal Italian painters. London: Woodfall & Kinder. pp. 67. "Wornum."
