= Peeter Baltens =

Flemish Renaissance painter, draughtsman, engraver and publisher (c. 1527–1584)

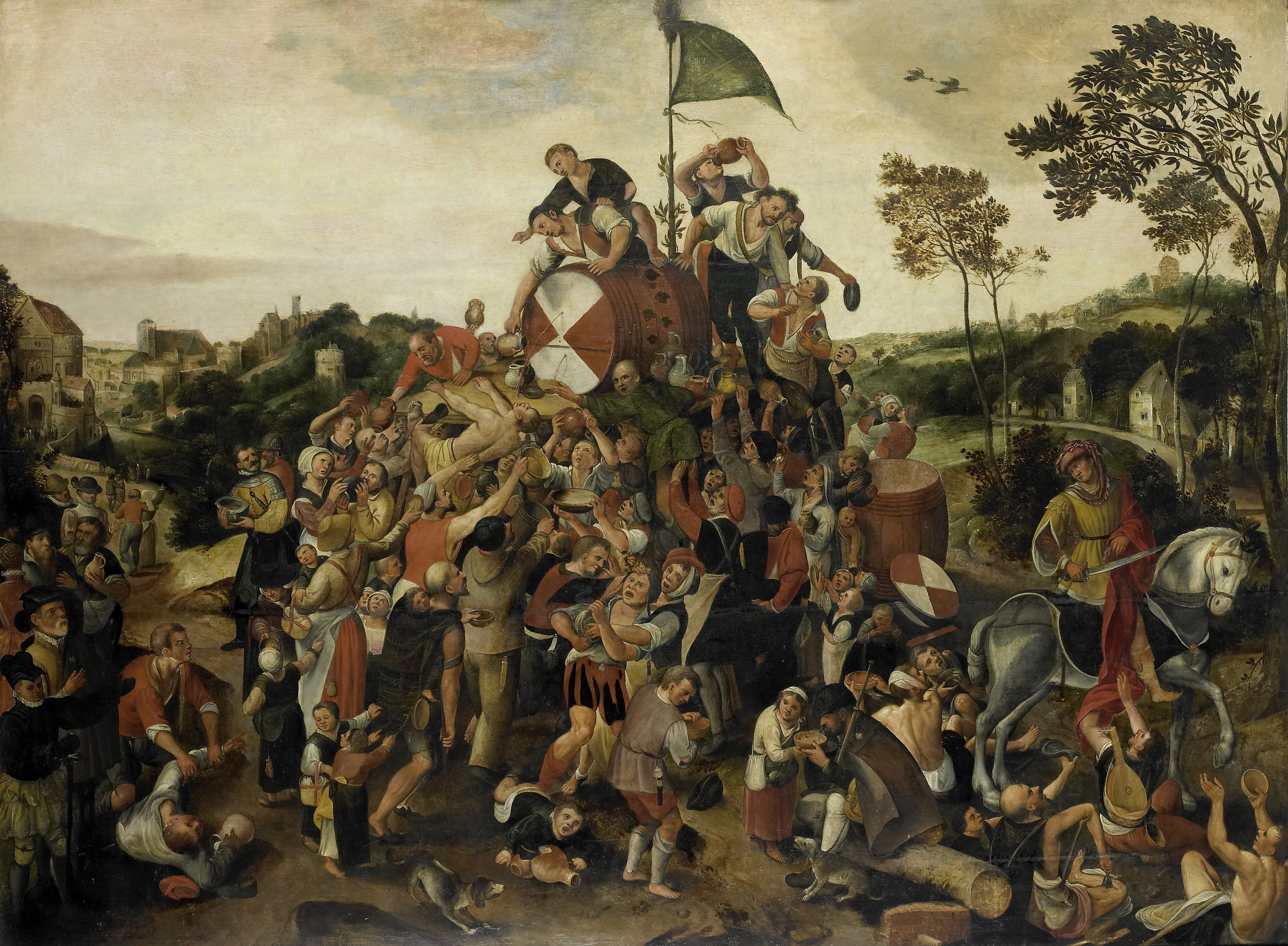
St Martin's Day Kermis

Peeter Baltens, Pieter Balten or Pieter Custodis (c. 1527 in Antwerp – 1584 in Antwerp), was a Flemish Renaissance painter, draughtsman, engraver and publisher. Baltens was also active as an art dealer and poet. He was known for his genre paintings, religious compositions and landscapes.

His career and artistic development and that of the Flemish painter Pieter Bruegel the Elder were closely intertwined. He is credited as being one of the key inventors of the genre of the village scene in Flemish and Dutch art.

== Life ==
Details about the life of Pieter Baltens are scarce. Baltens was born in Antwerp c. 1527 as the son of the sculptor Baltens Custodis (or Baltens Janszoon de Costere). He was registered as a member of the local Guild of Saint Luke in 1540 under the name 'Pierken Custodis'. He was admitted as a master of the Guild in 1550.

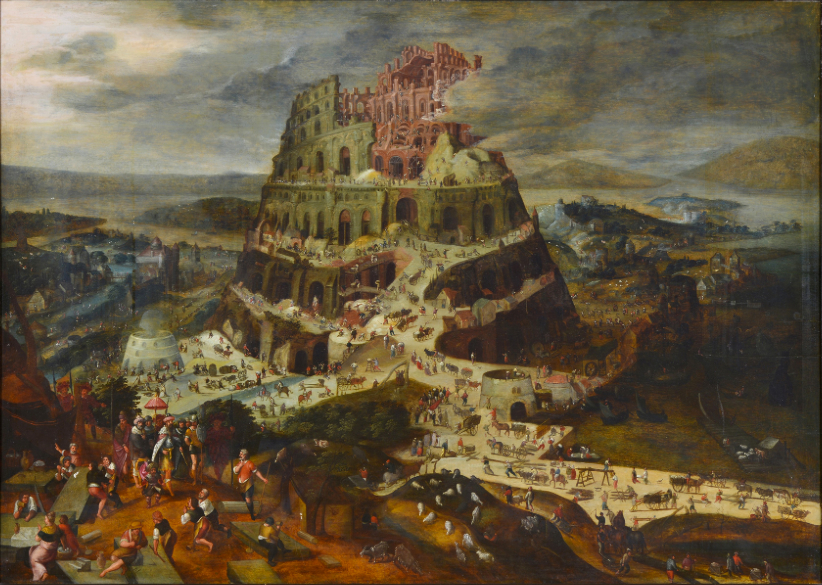
The tower of Babel

The early 17th-century Flemish art historian Karel van Mander is the key source on the life of Baltens. Van Mander stated in his 1604 Schilder-boeck that Baltens became a member of the Guild of St. Luke in 1579. It is now known from other sources that van Mander had this date wrong. Van Mander's error is possibly due to a misreading of the date 1569, the date on which Baltens became a member of the governing board of the Guild. Another erroneous statement by van Mander, which had a devastating impact on Baltens' art historical reputation, was to call Baltens a follower of Pieter Bruegel the Elder. Van Mander was in fact wrong on the date on which Baltens joined the local Guild as well as on Baltens' relationship with Pieter Bruegel the Elder which he qualified as that of a follower.

In 1550-1551 Bruegel in fact worked as an assistant of Peeter Baltens and eventually painted his own version of Balten's Tower of Babel. The two artists are known to have collaborated on an altarpiece (now lost) for the Glovemakers' Guild in Mechelen. In this commission it was Baltens who painted the central part of the altarpiece and Bruegel the wings in grisaille. This division of tasks suggests that Baltens was the more established figure in the collaboration.

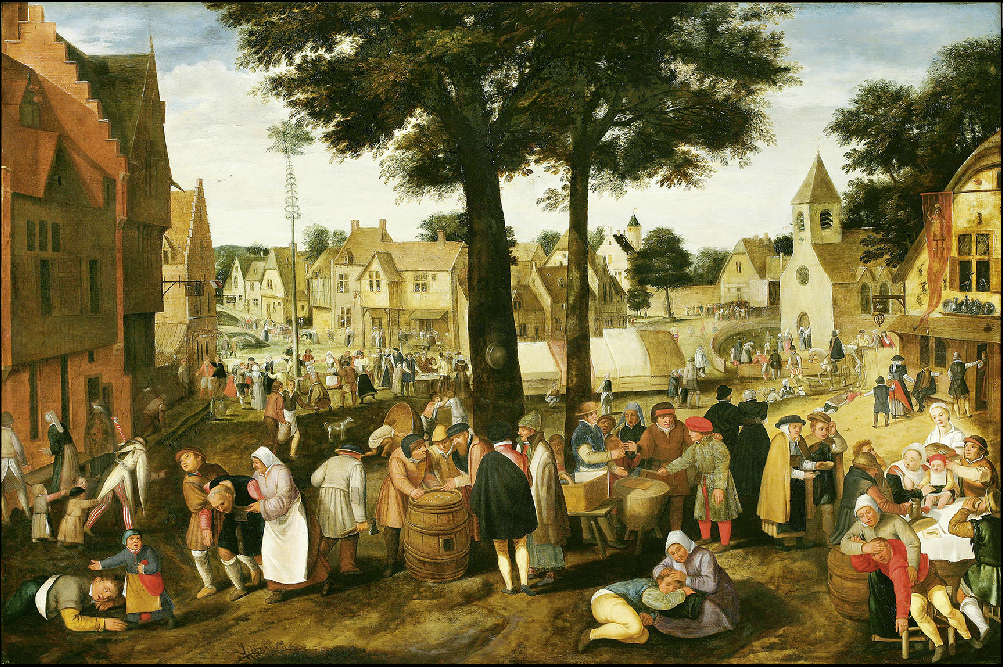
Grand Kermis of St George

Van Mander further claimed that Baltens visited different countries and made various views from life even though there is no record of such travels. Van Mander wrote that Baltens was a good poet and rederijker and collaborated from time to time with the painter Cornelis Ketel. Peeter Baltens was a member of the Chamber of rhetoric called Violieren.

Baltens' son Dominicus moved to Germany where he married the widow of Bartholomäus Kilian. He set up an engraving workshop in Augsburg, which was known as the Kilian family of engravers.

== Work ==
=== General ===
Baltens' known oeuvre is limited to 13 paintings and 11 drawings, of which only one is fully signed and none are dated. Baltens painted religious works, village scenes and landscapes, some of which were winter landscapes. He is also believed to have painted tronies, a type of portrait painting depicting unidentified sitters usually with exaggerated facial expressions. An example is the Portrait of a weeping peasant (Auktionshaus Thomas Bergmann) attributed to the artist. Some of the tronies earlier attributed to Baltens have been re-attributed to Marten van Cleve, a contemporary artist with a similar interest in peasant scenes and tronies.

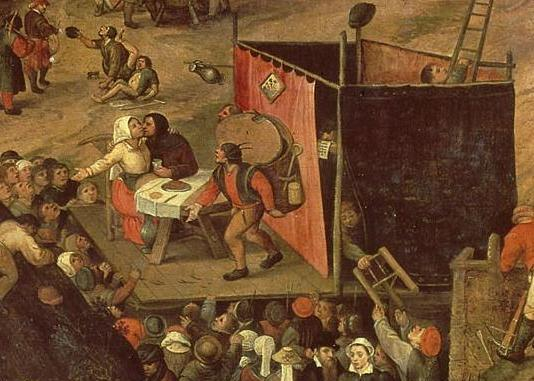
The performance of the farce of the phony water, fragment

Not many signed works of Baltens have been preserved. He signed his paintings and drawings with 'PB', 'P. Baltens', 'Peeter Balten', 'Peeter Baltens' and Peeter B.

=== Genre painter of peasant life ===
His work was mainly dedicated to a genre that became very popular during his lifetime: the depiction of the traditions of peasant life. He was one of the first artists to create realistic renderings of village feasts and celebrations with crowds of revellers. While art historians used to regard Baltens as a follower of Pieter Bruegel in the peasant genre, it is now believed to be more likely for Baltens to have influenced Bruegel rather than the other way around or that the artists drew inspiration from each other's works. It also known that Baltens' earliest collaboration with Breughel was on an altarpiece for the Glovemakers' Guild in Mechelen (now lost) and that in that collaboration Baltens appeared to be the more established artist as he was in charge of painting the central panel. Baltens' work was also influential on the next generation of the Bruegel dynasty as Pieter Bruegel the Elder's son and imitator Pieter Bruegel the Younger copied a detail of Baltens' Ecce homo and turned it into an independent work.

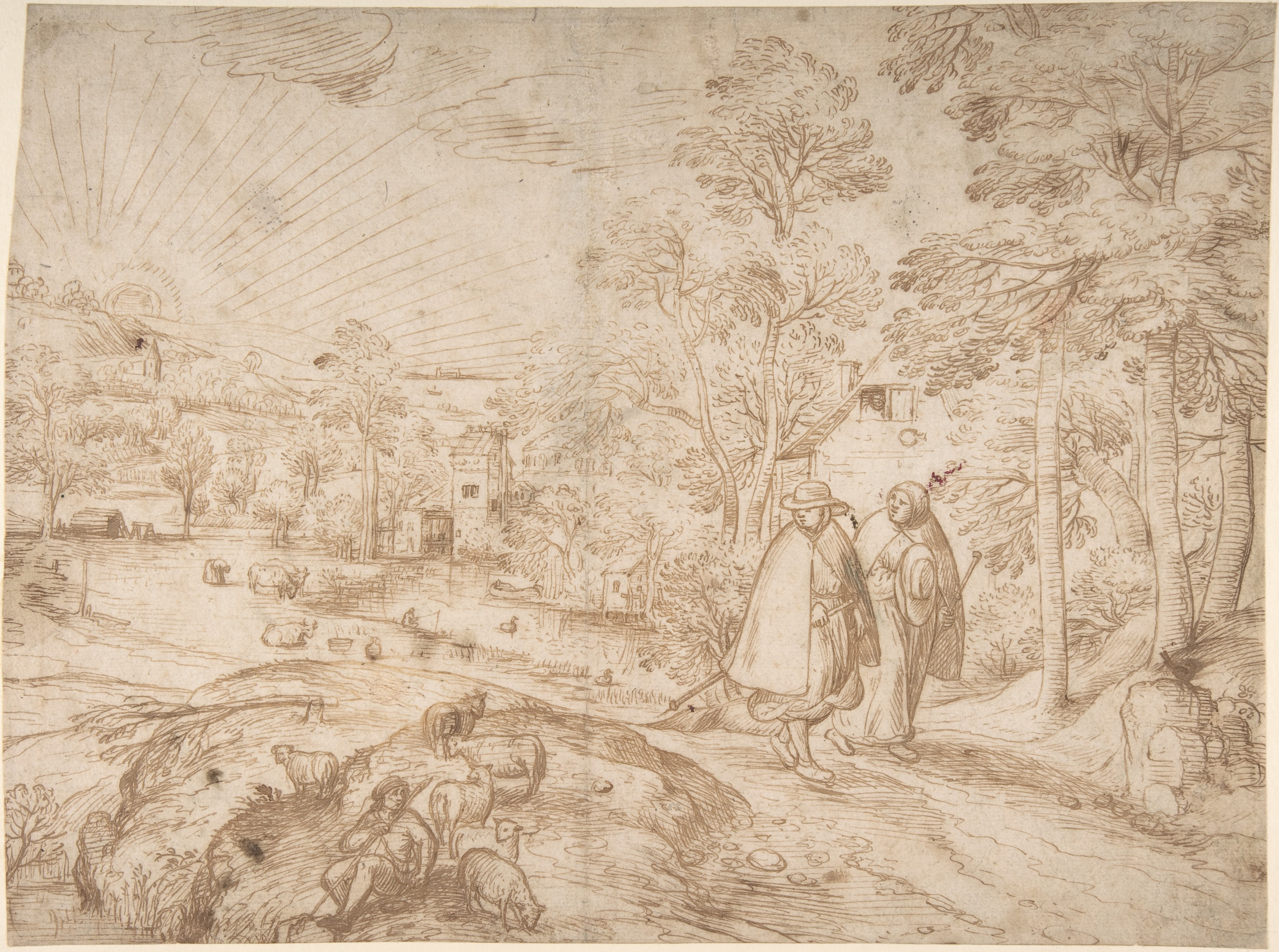
Landscape with two pilgrims walking along a road

His highly coloured and energetically painted figures emphasize the farcical aspects of village life. His interest in the comical side of village life is evident in The performance of the farce of the phony water (c. 1550, Rijksmuseum). The composition depicts a village scene with the performance of the popular farce Een cluyte van Plaeyerwater ('A farce of phony water'). The farce tells the story of a wife who sends her husband to find phony water to cure her. In fact the wife plots to have a tryst with her lover, a priest. The wife's plot is foiled when the husband is informed about his wife's intentions and catches her.

Peeter Baltens' style is characterised by clearly and energetically defined forms. His palette, showing a preference for bright red, which made the figures stand out from the background, was audacious in its time. These bright colors emphasized the exuberant gaiety of the villagers' merrymaking.

His most famous composition is the St Martin's Day Kermis of which there are two versions, one in the Rijksmuseum and the other in the Royal Museum of Fine Arts Antwerp. This work was long believed to be a copy after a work by Pieter Bruegel the Elder referred to as the Wine of St Martins Day. The Bruegel painting was believed lost until it showed up at an art auction and was acquired by the Prado Museum.

=== Landscape artist ===
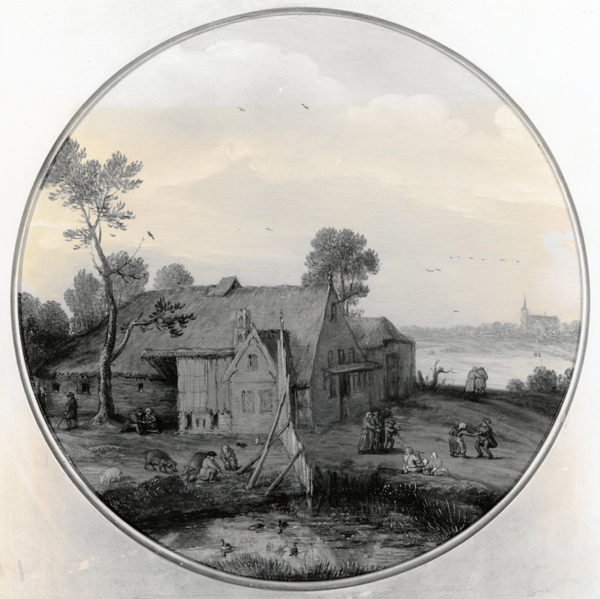
Landscape with Peasant Cottage

Van Mander praised Baltens as a landscape painter. Originally no known independent landscapes by Baltens were known until in 1985 a group of six pen-and-ink landscape drawings were attributed to the artist (Louvre, Plantin-Moretus Museum and Nationalmuseum). The attributions of these works, some of which previously given to Bruegel or Hans Bol, are based on the only fully signed sheet (signed 'PEETER BALTENS'), entitled Wooded Landscape with Horsemen and Flock of Sheep (Staatsgalerie Stuttgart). The discovery of these drawings by Baltens has given rise to the supposition that Pieter Bruegel the Elder's earliest landscape drawings may have been influenced by Baltens' landscape drawings.

Only one landscape painting by Baltens is known. Entitled Landscape with Peasant Cottage, this small roundel painting with a diameter of 23.5 cm was formally in the Museum Bredius in The Hague from which it was stolen. Signed and dated 'P. balten f./1581' the painting depicts a farmhouse near a body of water and a simple flat landscape with a church tower in the distance. The composition is very close to Dutch paintings from circa 1620. The painting has been cited in art literature to demonstrate the insufficiently acknowledged influence of Flemish artists on the work of the Dutch painter Esaias van de Velde. In this composition, the paint was applied thinly and quickly, and probably partly wet-in-wet. The cottage and the surrounding landscape were painted in various shades of light brown.

=== Religious compositions ===
The small body of work of Baltens that has been preserved includes a number of religious compositions. In addition to his Ecce homo, which was later the source of inspiration for an independent work of Pieter Breughel the Younger, he created works on popular themes such as Christ on the Road to Calvary and The Tower of Babel.

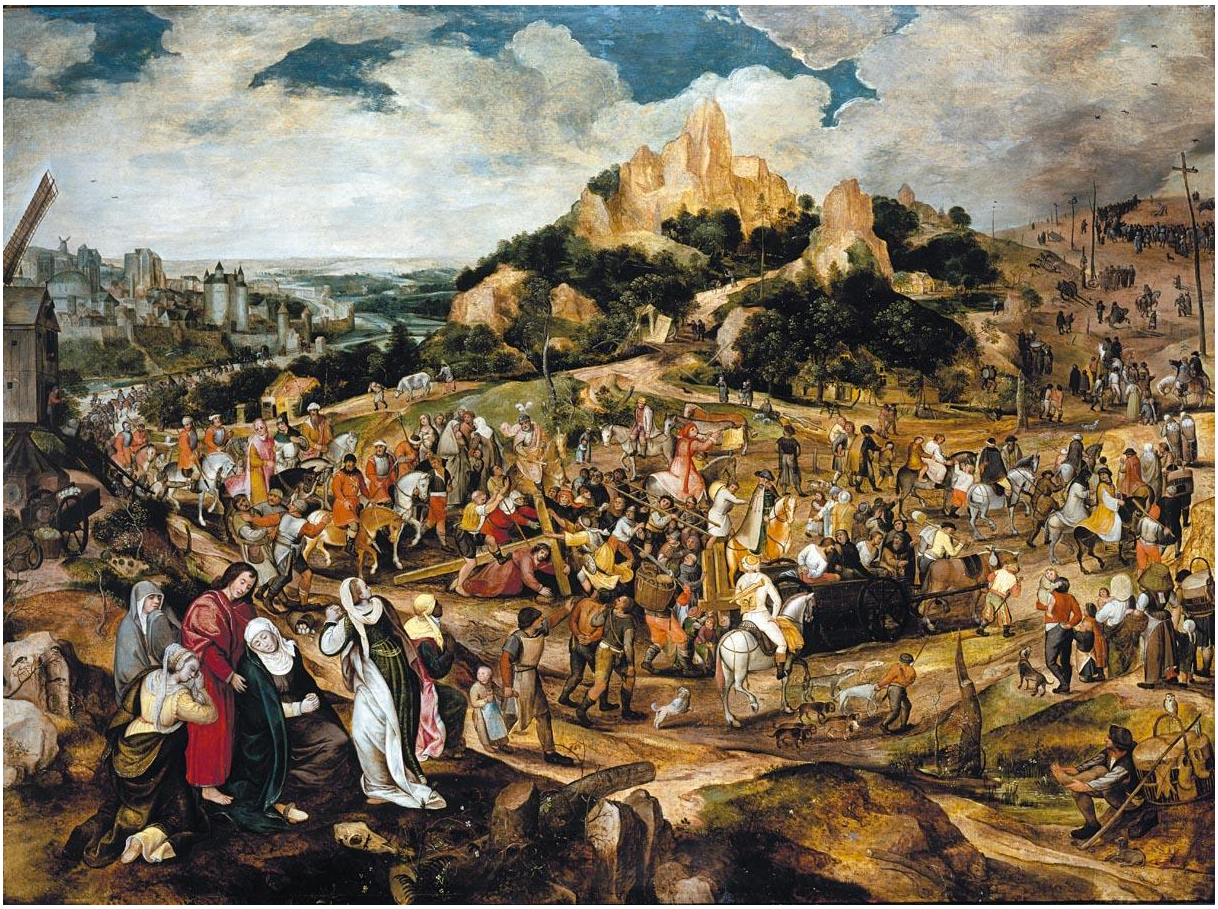
Christ on the Road to Calvary

His Christ on the Road to Calvary (Auctioned at Sotheby's on 7 July 2005 in London, lot 7) may have drawn some inspiration of Pieter Bruegel the Elder's treatment of this subject (1564, Kunsthistorisches Museum, Vienna), which Baltens likely knew in Antwerp. Both pictures offer a depiction of the subject that had become an established tradition in Flemish art by the 1560s. Some compositional elements of both works are similar: Christ is placed in the centre of the composition on his knees, a ring of figures surrounds the crucifixion site on a hilltop on the upper right, an officer on a white horse is placed between the viewer and Christ and horsemen in red tunics bring up at the rear the procession of figures. But there are also many differences between both works: while Bruegel placed the mourning group of the Three Maries and St John the Baptist in the right foreground Baltens arranges them differently on the left. Baltens' figures are also not Bruegel-like in style, but rather suggest that Baltens was influenced by Pieter Aertsen's figure style. Baltens' picture emphasized the processional element more than Bruegel's painting and includes many more figures.

Baltens' The Tower of Babel (Auctioned at HDV Geneve on 9 March 2016 in Geneva, lot 951) depicts a subject that was also depicted by Breugel and later by a whole range of Flemish artists. Whereas the subject of the Tower of Babel is usually interpreted as a critique of human hubris, and in particular on the Roman Catholic Church which at the time was undertaking at great expense large-scale construction projects such as the St. Peter's Basilica, it has also been viewed as a celebration of technical progress, which was heralding a better and more organized world.

=== Engraver and publisher ===
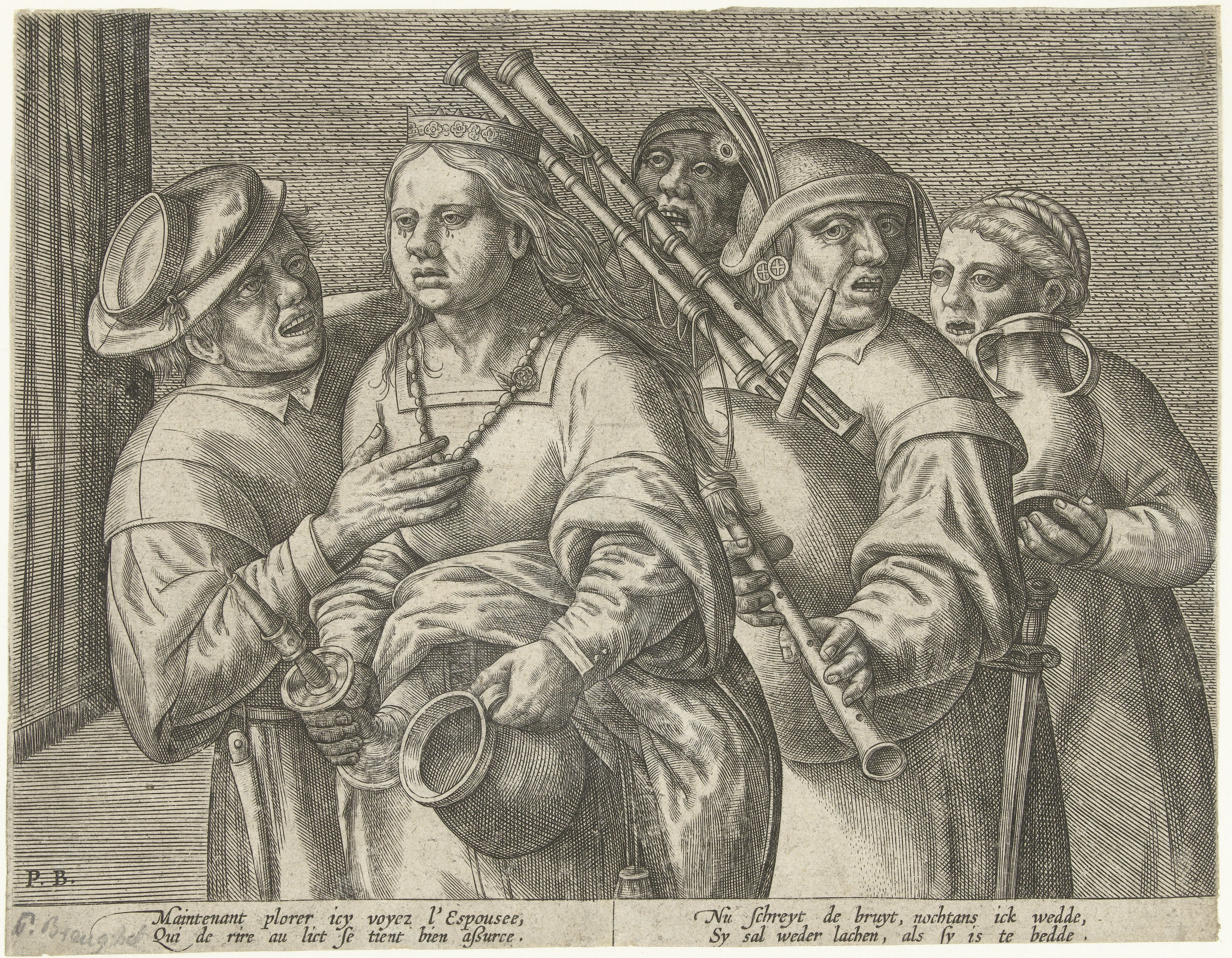
Evening of the Wedding

Baltens was further active as an engraver and publisher. His engravings are copies of his own work and that of other artists of his time such as Maerten de Vos and Ambrosius Francken I. He made engravings of popular subjects such as village scenes and allegories.

A well-known print by Baltens was the Evening of the Wedding, which depicts the tale of the bride who cannot help but weep when she is taken to bed on her wedding night. This theme popular in the 16th century. The bride is shown holding two suggestive objects, i.e. a candle and a jug. The verse below the engraving explains that the new bride's sorrow will be short-lived as once in bed she will soon laugh again. The print is part of a series that depicts the farcical side of peasant life for the town people who were the purchasers of these prints.

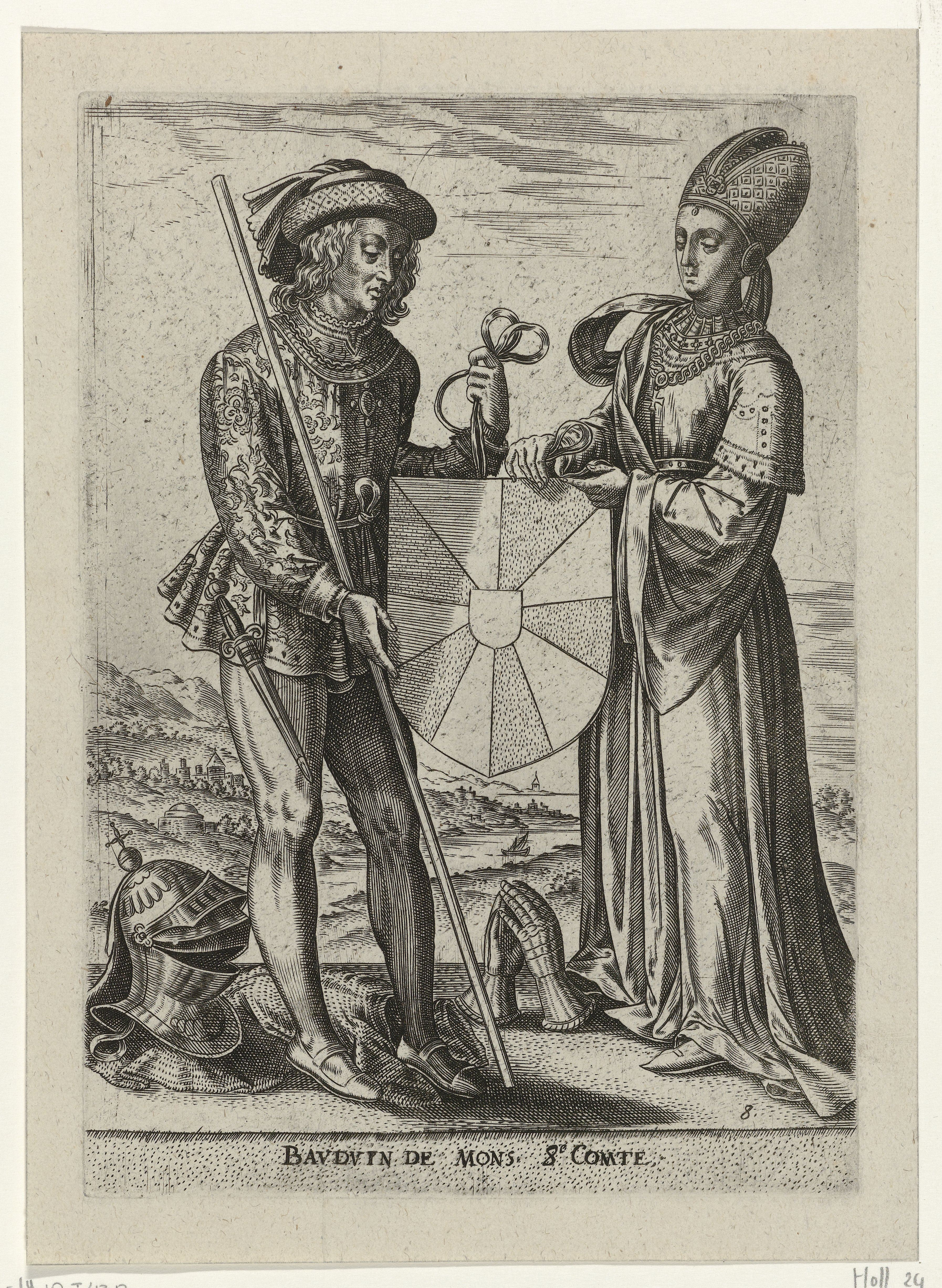
Portrait of Baldwin IV, Count of Flanders and Richilde, Countess of Hainaut

Baltens published a number of dynastic genealogies. In 1575 he published the Brabantiae Ducum imagines, a series of 11 prints depicting the Dukes of Brabant as Heads of the Order of the Golden Fleece, starting from the order's founder, Philip the Good, to the then current head of the Order, Philip II of Spain. Around 1580 Baltens published an illustrated book in Antwerp under the title: Les généalogies et anciennes descentes des forestiers et comtes de Flandre, avec brièves descriptions de leurs vies et gestes; le tout recueilly des plus véritables, approvées croniques et annales qui se trouvent, par Corneille Martin Zélandoys. et ornées de portraicts figures et habitz selon les façons et guises de leurs temps, ainsi qu’elles ont esté trouvées ès plus anciens tableaux, par Pierre Balthasar, et par lui-mesme mises en lumière (The genealogies of the Foresters and Counts of Flanders, with a brief description of their lives and deeds, as they have been found in the most genuine and approved chronicles and annals by Corneille Martin from Zeeland; and decorated with portraits, figures and dresses according to the fashion of the time, as they have been found in the oldest paintings and highlighted by Pierre Balthazar). The book contained prints of the 33 counts and countesses of Flanders including their mythical ancestors, the so-called 'forestiers'. The picture of each of these persons can be found on the recto of each folio, while the facing verso page offers a brief account of the person's life. The text was written by Corneille Martin. Peeter Baltens drew and engraved the plates, had the book printed and sold it in his publishing house.

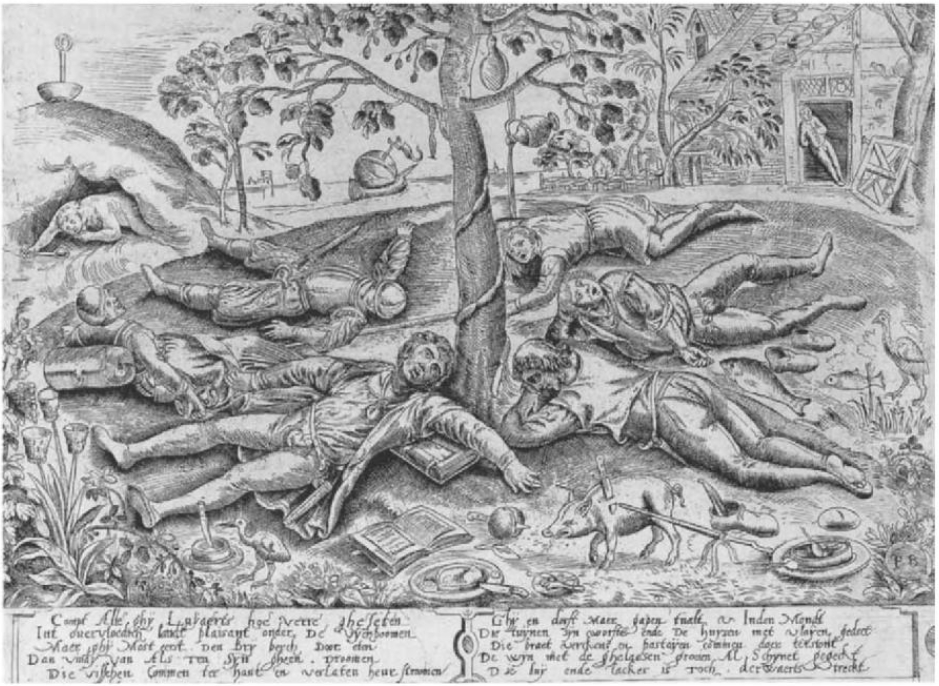
Land of Cockaigne

Some of his original engravings are believed to have inspired Pieter Bruegel the Elder's compositions. For instance, a print of Baltens on the theme of the Land of Cockaigne ('Luilekkerland' in Dutch) was likely the inspiration for Bruegel's treatment of the subject (Alte Pinakothek, Munich). Some original engravings of Baltens were in the past attributed to Pieter Bruegel as Baltens used the monogram 'PB' on some of his prints.

He published also engravings of works by Maerten de Vos, Ambrosius Francken and Hans Vredeman de Vries.

== Sources ==
- Nadine Orenstein, Pieter Bruegel the Elder: Drawings and Prints, Metropolitan Museum of Art (New York, N.Y.), Museum Boijmans Van Beuningen (Rotterdam, Netherlands), 2001
