= Kilian family =

German engraver dynasty

Kilian is a dynasty of German engravers from Augsburg, Germany, that were active there for over a century.

The patriarch was Bartholomaus Kilian, a goldsmith, who married Maria Pfeiffelmann, and they had two sons Lucas and Wolfgang. Bartholomaus died, and his wife remarried the engraver Dominicus Custos. Together with him, she had three more sons, Raphael, David and Jacob Custos (or Custodis). Wolfgang in turn had two sons who became engravers, Bartholomaus the younger and Philipp. Philipp's son Wolfgang Philipp also became an engraver.

After them, there were a few more generations, and Georg Christophe (1709–1781) formed the collection of the family works conserved in the library at Augsburg.
