= Raphael Custos =

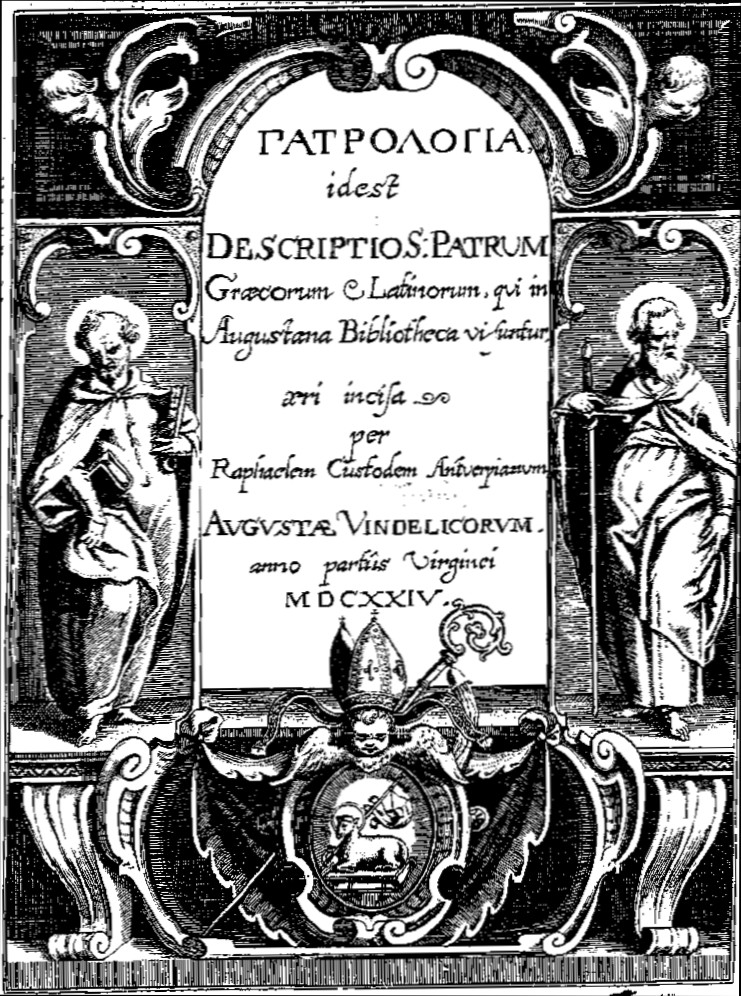
Patrologia, 1624

Raphael Custos, or Custodis (1590–1664), was a German engraver and member of the Kilian family of engravers in Augsburg.

== Biography ==
He was born in Augsburg as the oldest biological son of Dominicus Custos and Maria Pfeiffelmann, who already had two sons by her first marriage, Lucas and Wolfgang Kilian. His parents later had two more sons, David and Jacob Custos, and they all became pupils of their father Dominicus. After his father's death in 1612, Raphael continued the family workshop. Though his stepbrothers began their own workshops in Augsburg, they remained in close collaboration, as Raphael did not travel himself, but stayed to run family affairs while his brothers made business trips.

== Works ==
- Emblemata sacra passionis salvatoris nostri Jesu Christi, with Lucas Kilian, 1620
- Emblemata amoris, Emblem book after works by Otto van Veen, 1622
- Patrologia: i.e. Descriptio S. Patrum, qui in Augustana, 1624

== Sources ==
- Raphael Custos on Artnet

== Gallery ==
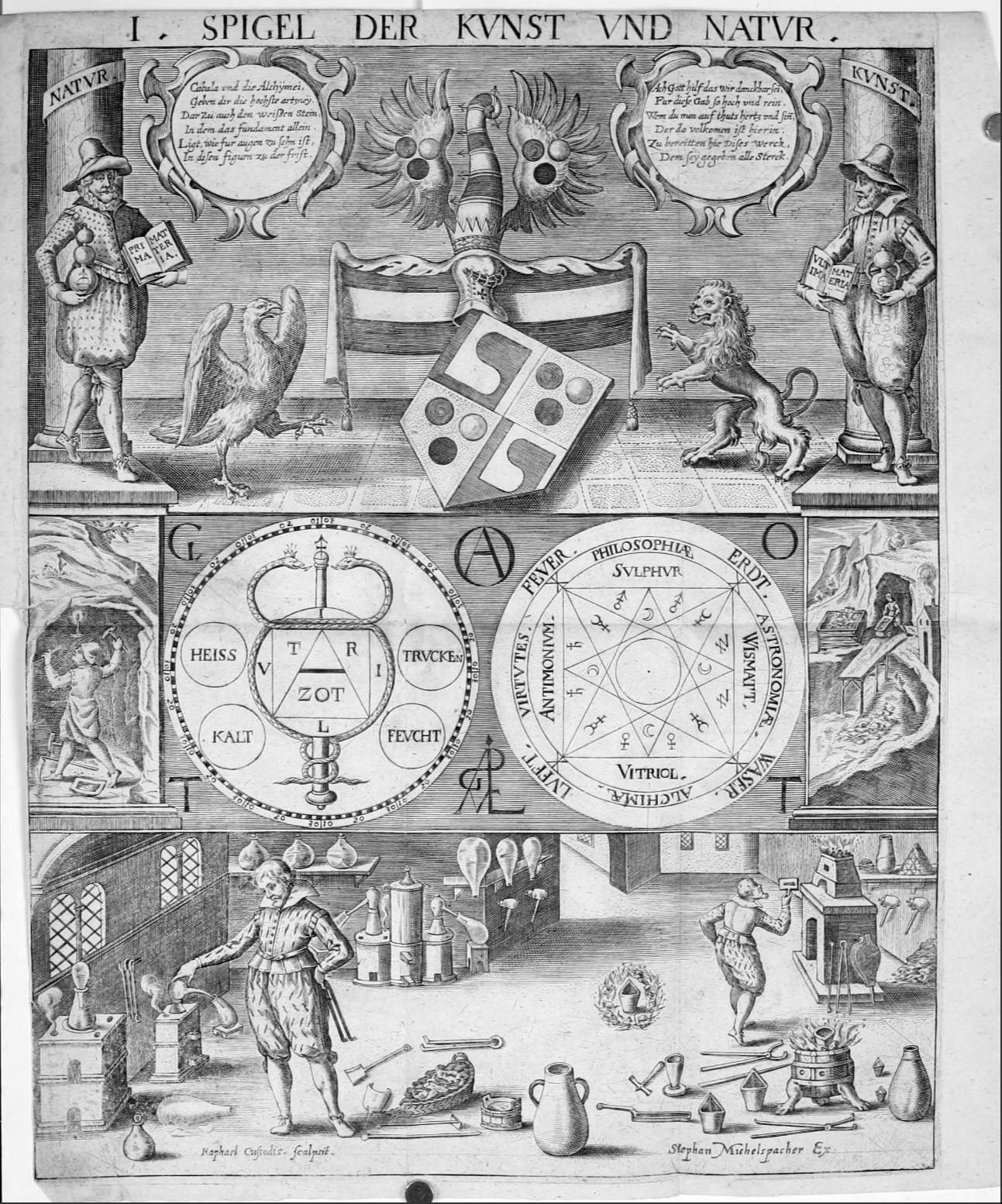
Illustration 1 from Spiegel der Kunst und Natur in Alchymia 1663

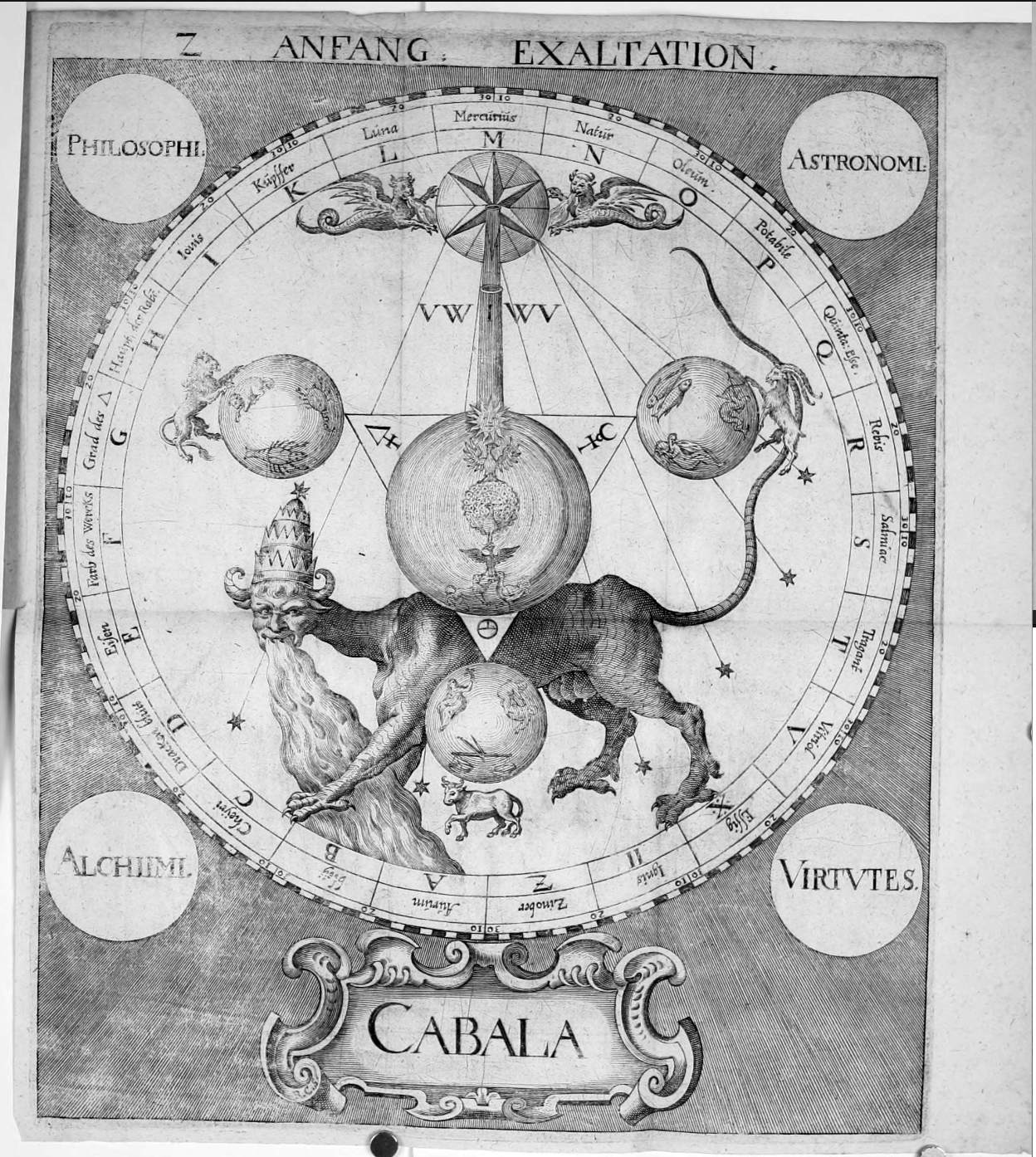
Illustration 2 from Spiegel der Kunst und Natur in Alchymia 1663

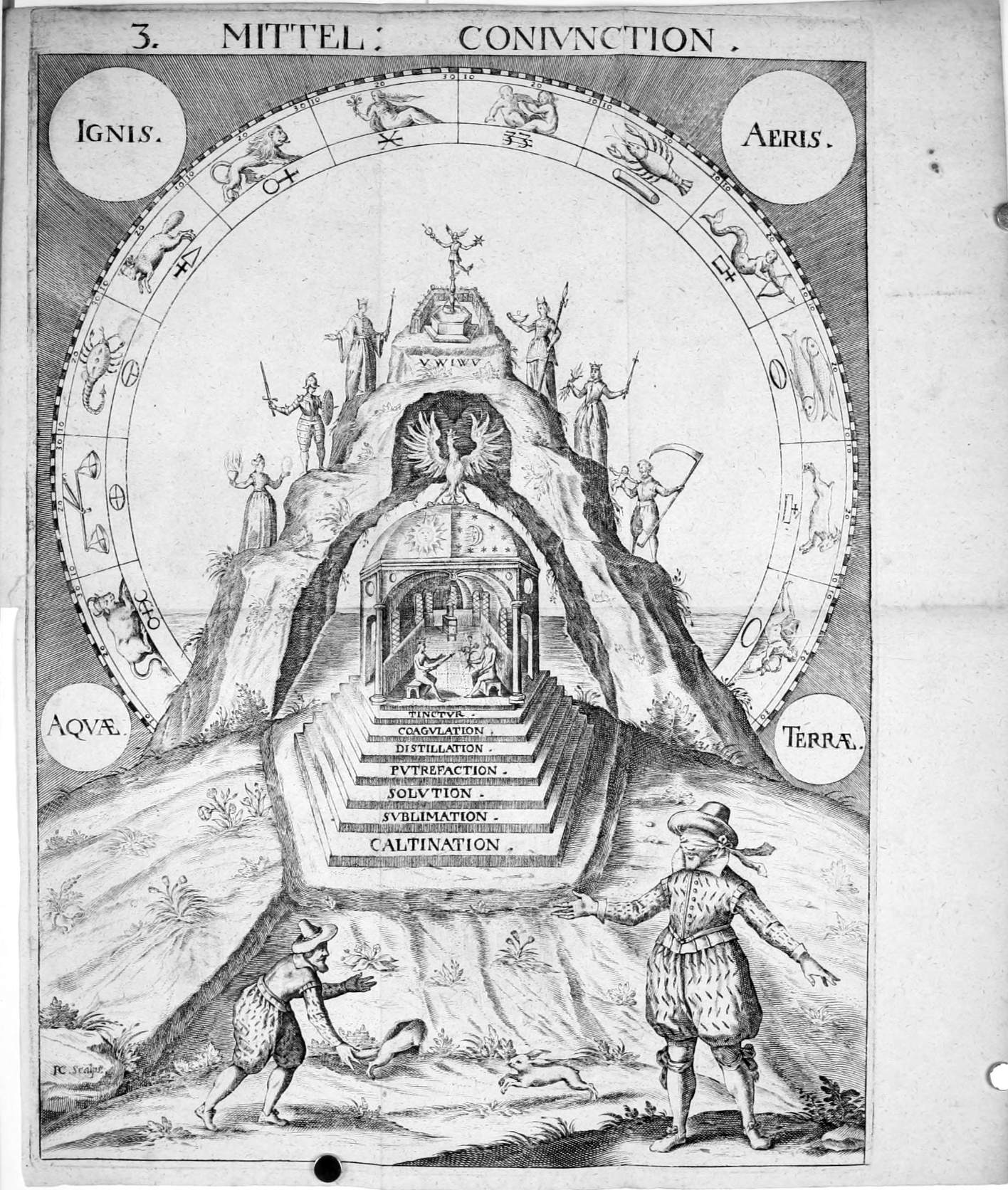
Illustration 3 from Spiegel der Kunst und Natur in Alchymia 1663

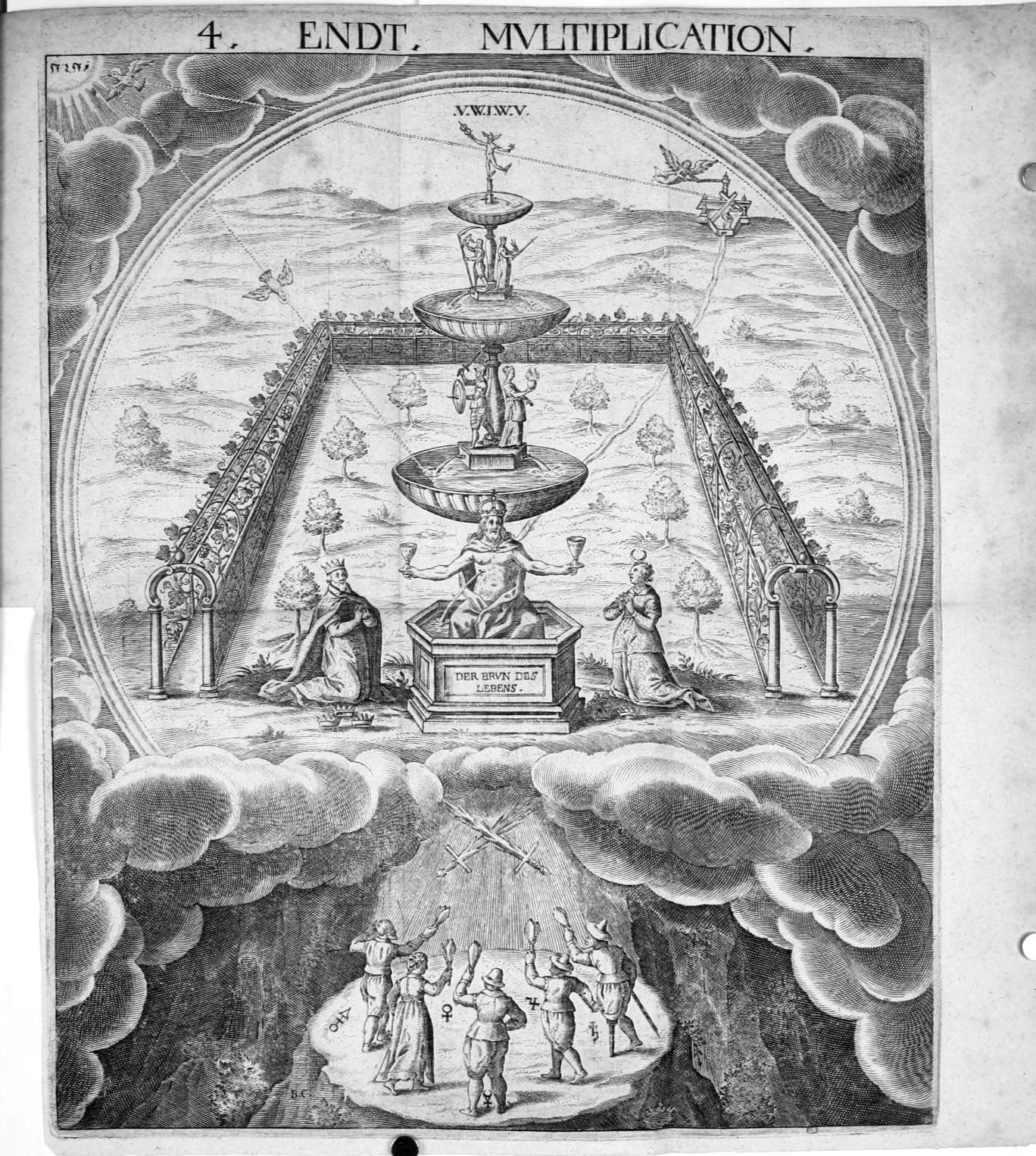
Illustration 4 from Spiegel der Kunst und Natur in Alchymia 1663
