= Johann Remmelin =

German physician and philosopher (1583–1632)

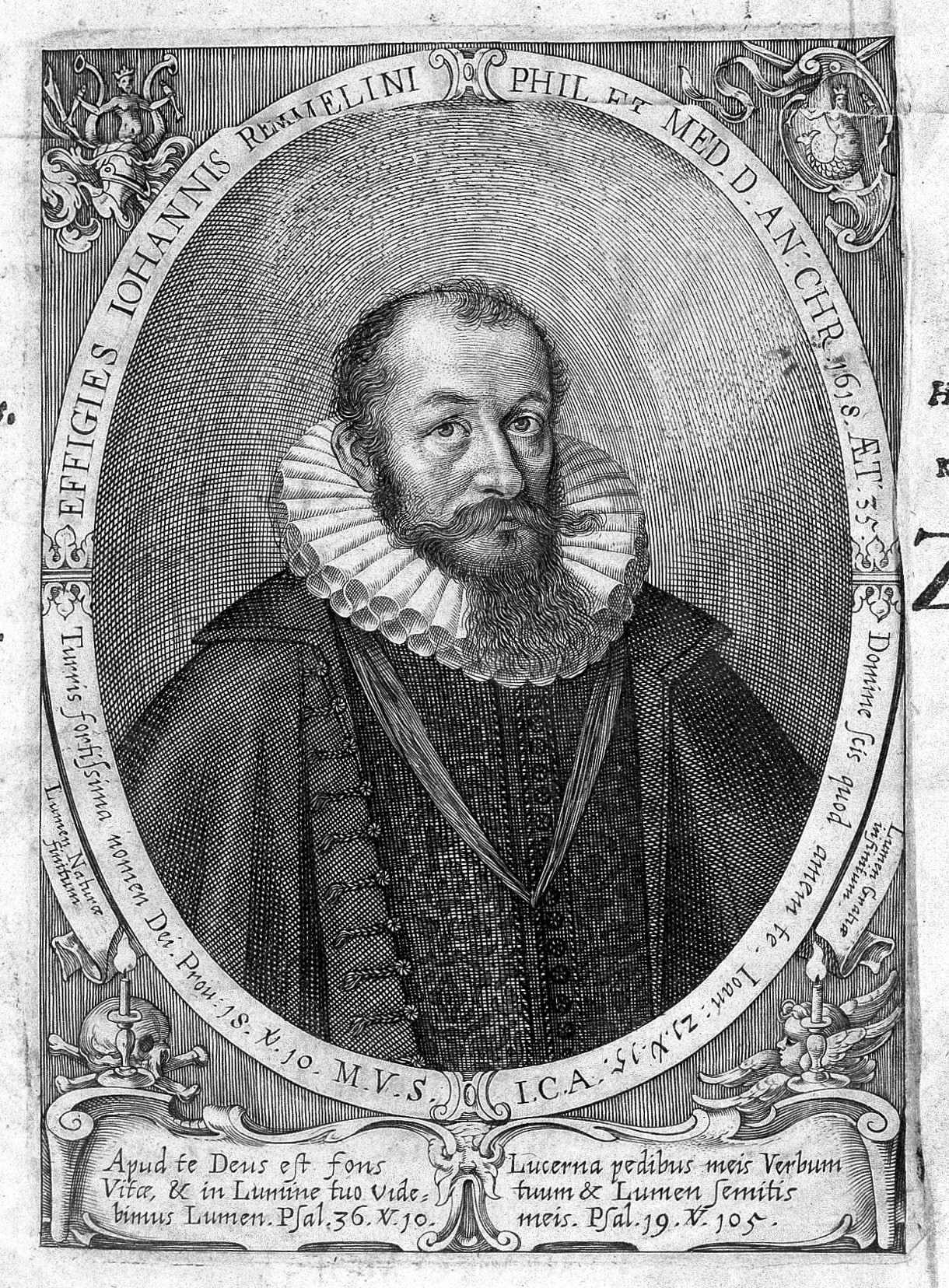

Johann Remmelin (Latinized as Johannes Remmelius and in German as Johannes Rümelin) (28 July 1583 – 1632) was a German city physician who worked in Ulm. He is best known as the inventor of a peelable flapbook dealing with human anatomy. This book, titled Catoptrum microcosmicum, suis aere incisis visionibus splendens cum historia, & pinace, de novo prodit, originally in Latin and issued in 1613 with later editions and translations, had pages with flaps that could be opened to show the anatomy of the human body in layers, simulating a dissection.

== Life and work ==
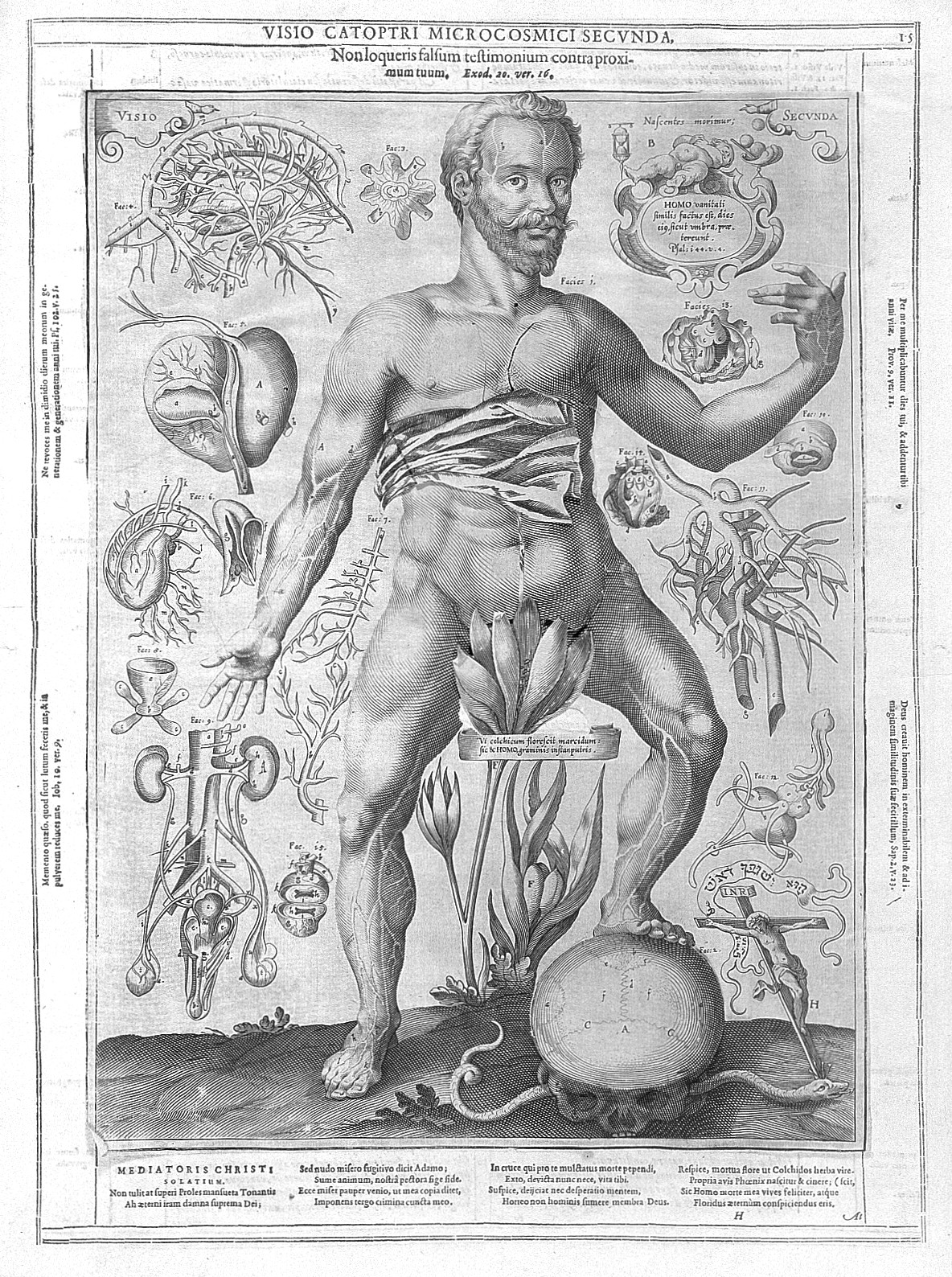
A plate

Rümelin was born in Ulm, one of eighteen children of merchant Hans Ludwig Rümelin and Elisabet Marchtaler. The theologian Johannes Piscadorius who was born in Rümelin may have been a relative but little is known of Rümelin's early life. He became a student at the University of Tübingen and matriculated in June 1602. He studied philosophy and became a master on 22 August 1604. He then went to Basel in 1605 and received a doctorate in 1607 with a dissertation titled "Medica de dentium statu et naturali et praeternaturali huiusque sublatione, illius vero conservatione determinatio, quam .... M. Johannes Remmelius Suevo Ulmensis inauguralis speciminis causa defensurus proponit". He then became a physician in Ulm but following disputes he moved out. The cause of the problem was that the city regulations required doctors to only prescribe and let pharmacists provide the medicine. Rümelin as well as the doctors Hönes and Stromaier had to move out because they clashed with the pharmacists. They found the pharmacies were sloppy and began to obtain the drugs themselves for the patients. This led to their being denounced in 1611 and he was asked to give an explanation in 1613 by the city council. After further bureaucratic struggles, a house search, and confiscation of medicines, he became a city physician at Schorndorf in 1617. There he had a son, Johann Anastasius (b. 1621), who also became a physician. He has been said to have worked at Aalen around 1628 (but with little evidence) from where he moved to Augsburg as a plague doctor. His death was recorded in Augsburg in June 1629 according to the city archives (but without the date). Rümelin was married twice, first to Rosine Kallhardt from Ulm, widow of a Jakob Rüber in Konstanz, whom he married at Ulm in 1607. In 1609 he married Elisabeth Vesenbeck, daughter of theologian Johannes Vesenbeck of Ulm. His portrait was included in the 1619 Latin edition of his book. He also took an interest in mystical numerological studies and was noted as a collaborator of Johann Faulhaber.

Rümelin is best known for his work Catoptrum microcosmicum (meaning 'mirror of the microcosm'). The illustrations were drawn by Lucas Kilian (1579–1637) and engraved in copper by Stephan Michelspacher. The work was made with three plates and foldouts and in some parts the anatomy went down to nearly 17 layers. In the 1613 edition, Remmelin's name was not visible but a supposed portrait and coat-of-arms was included on the first plate. An English edition was produced in 1702 by Clopton Havers. A Japanese edition, the first anatomy text in Japan, was produced by Motoki Ryōi in 1696 as 和蘭全賭内外分合図 (Oranda zenkunai gaibun gōzu).
