= Matthäus Merian the Younger =

Swiss engraver and portrait painter (1621–1687)

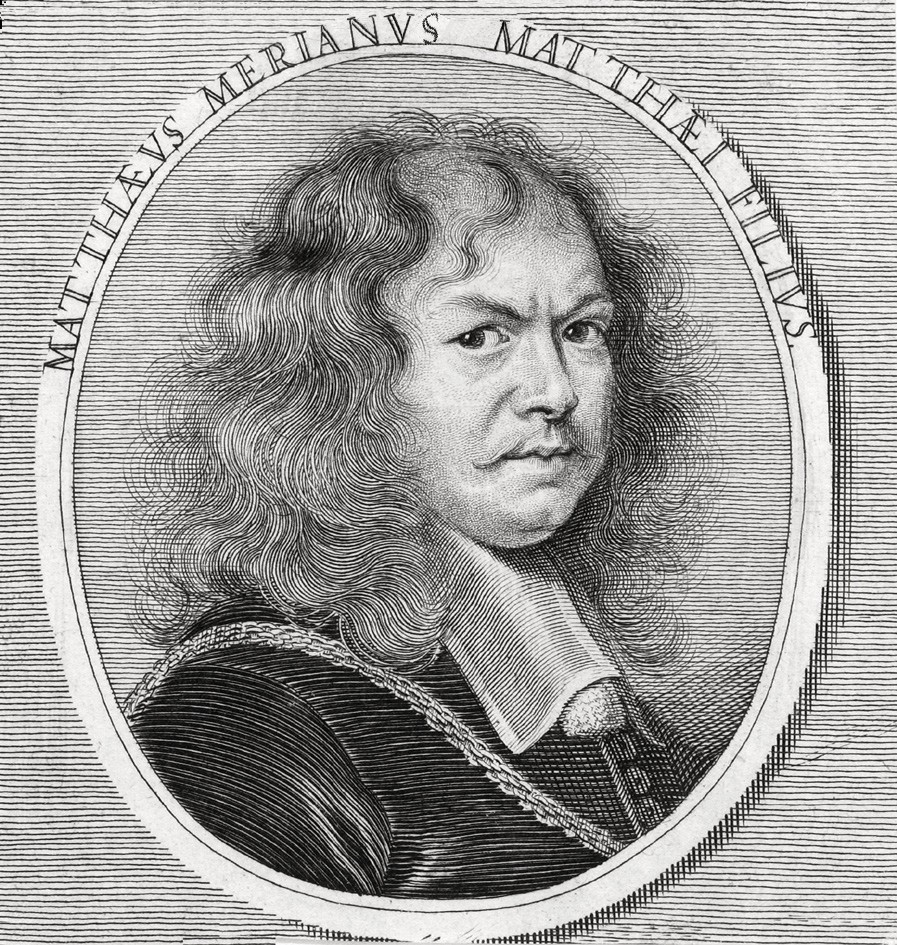
Portrait by Joachim von Sandrart for his Teutsche Academie

Matthäus Merian (25 March 1621 – 15 February 1687) was a Swiss engraver and portrait painter.

== Biography ==
He was born in Basel as the eldest son of Matthäus Merian the Elder and his first wife Maria Magdalena née de Bry; like his father he became an engraver. He was the half-brother of Maria Sybilla Merian and the brother of Caspar Merian. He is documented as having served Carl Gustaf Wrangel as an importer of wine and other luxury goods and is known for his portraits. He became a teacher of Bartholomäus Kilian.

After the death of his grandfather Johann Theodor de Bry, his father took over his publishing house in Frankfurt, where Matthew the Younger became a pupil of Joachim von Sandrart. With him he went to Amsterdam in 1637, to Paris in 1641 and to London in 1639 with Anthonis van Dyck.

In 1642, Merian returned to Frankfurt, but from 1643 to 1647 he stayed in Italy to study. In 1647 he took part as a political agent and representative of several princes at the Peace Congress in Nuremberg, of whose participants he made portraits. From 1647/48 he was also in the service of Carl Gustaf Wrangel, whom he portrayed several times.

After the death of his father in 1650, he ran the publishing house together with his younger brother Caspar Merian and published further volumes of the Topographia Germaniae and the Theatrum Europaeum. Apart from these series, however, the publishing house produced hardly any books. Merian achieved his greatest successes as a portraitist, for example in 1658 at the coronation of Leopold I in Frankfurt. Merian also created altarpieces, among others for Bamberg Cathedral and the Barfüßerkirche in Frankfurt.

Merian died on 15 February 1687 in Frankfurt. His grave in the Peterskirchhof in Frankfurt is preserved.

== Gallery ==
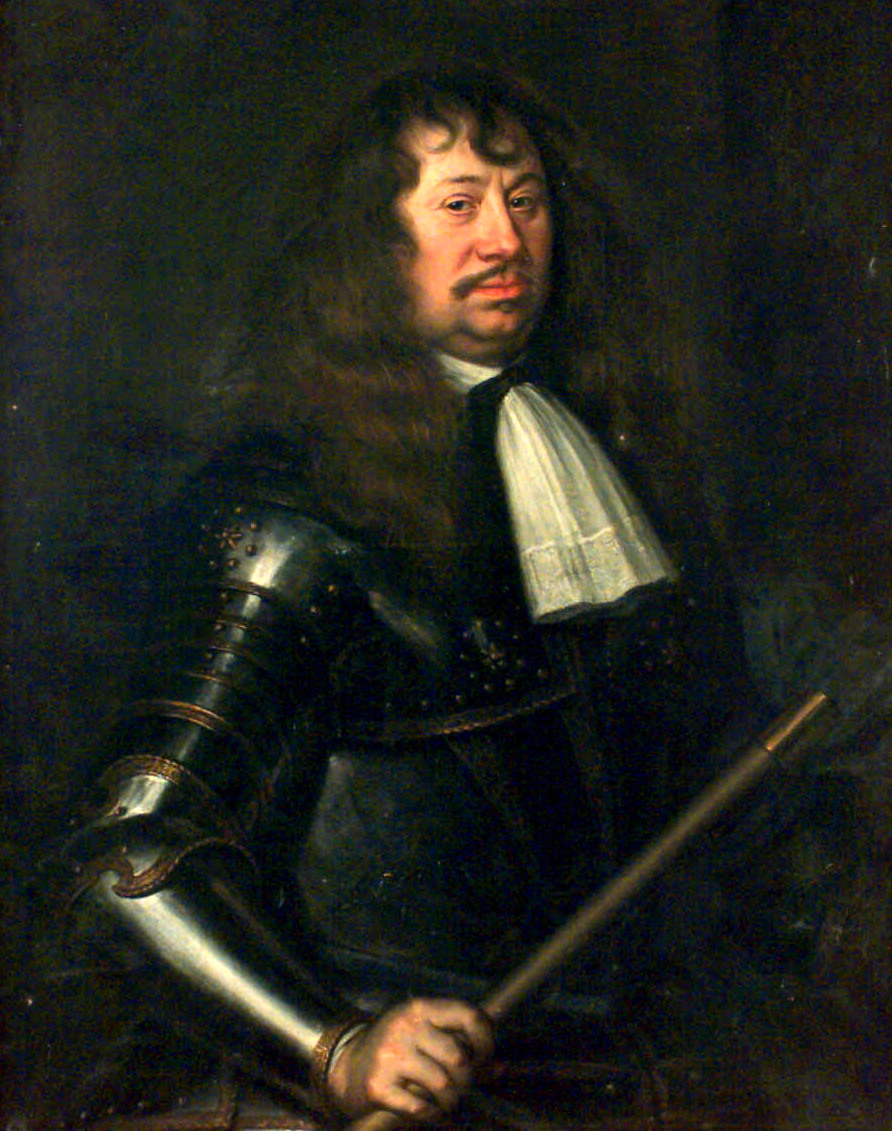
Portrait of Carl Gustaf Wrangel (1662)

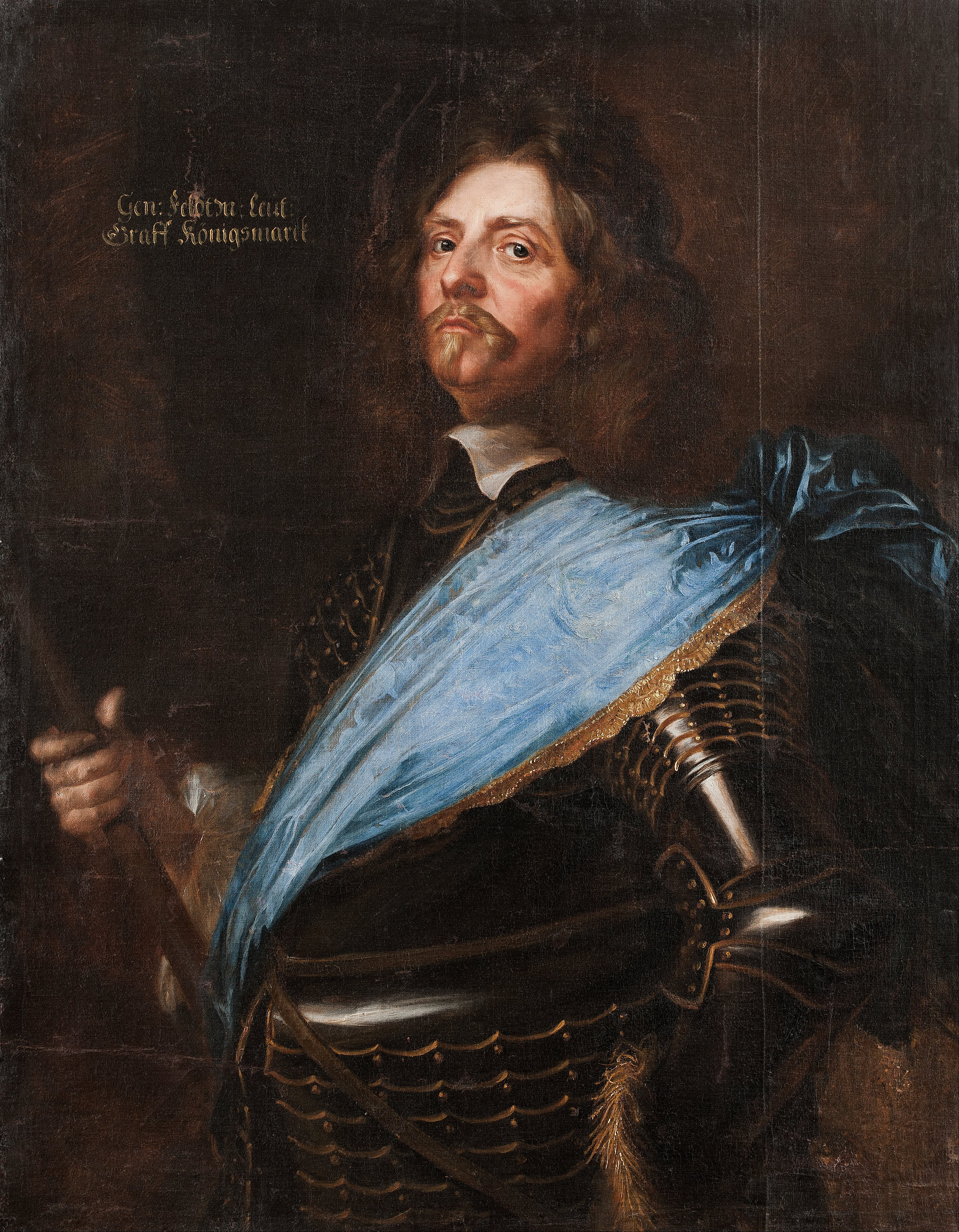
Hans Christoff von Königsmarck (1660–1663)

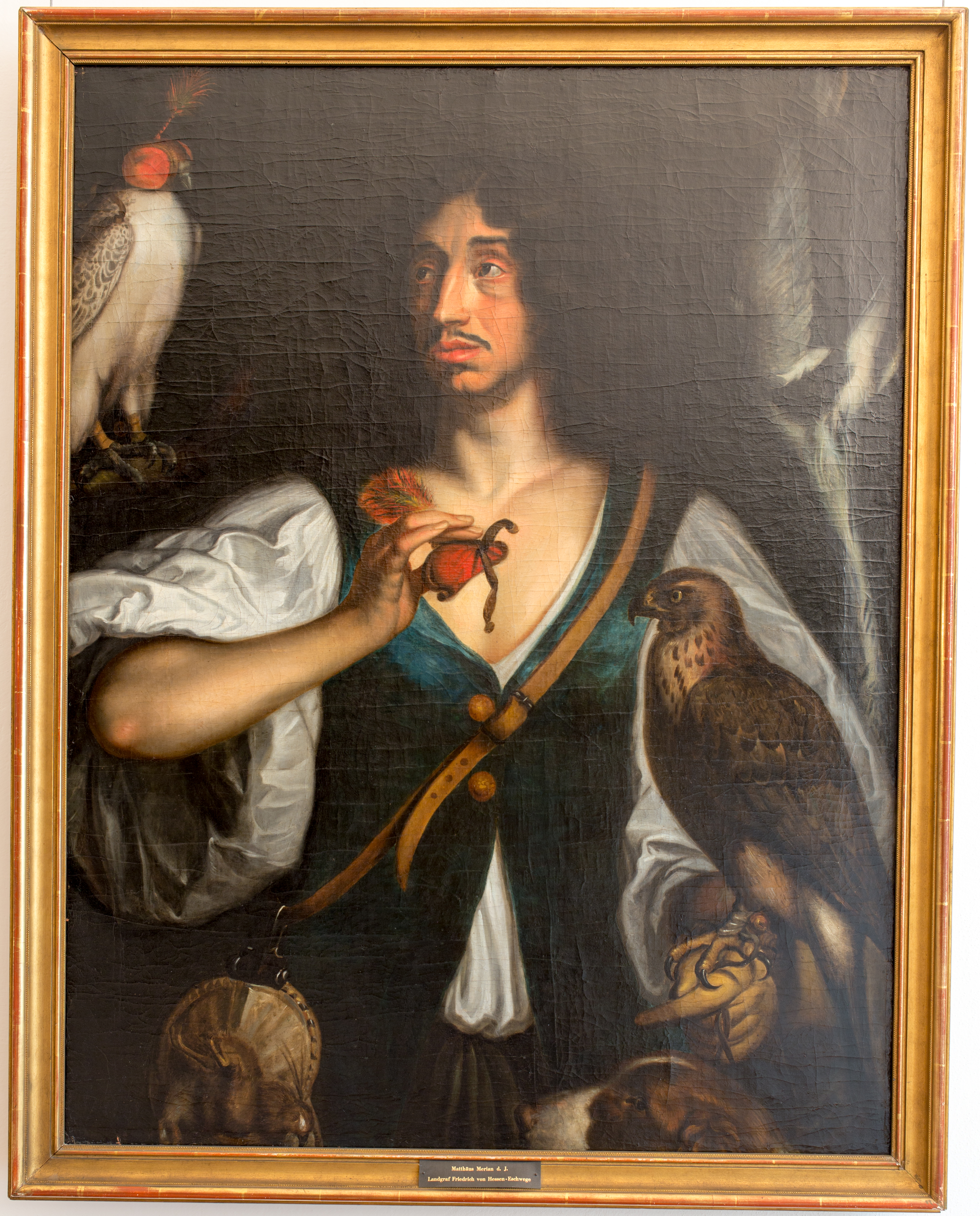
Frederick, Landgrave of Hesse-Eschwege as a falconer (before 1655); located at the Jagdschloss Grunewald

== Sources ==
- Rudolf Wackernagel: Selbstbiographie des jüngeren Matthäus Merian. In: Basler Jahrbuch 1895. S. 227–244.
- Daniela Nieden: Matthäus Merian der Jüngere (1621–1678). Diss., Univ. Freiburg/Br. 2002, Göttingen 2002.
- Andreas Priever: Die ‘causa’ Merian. Streit im Chor der Frankfurter Barfüßerkirche. In: Andrea Bendlage, Andreas Priever, Peter Schuster (Hrsg.): Recht und Verhalten in vormodernen Gesellschaften. Festschrift für Neithard Bulst. Bielefeld 2008, S. 233–253.
- Edgar Bonjour (1994). "Merian". Neue Deutsche Biographie (in German). Vol. 17. Berlin: Duncker & Humblot. pp. 134–135. (full text online).
