= Bartholomäus Kilian =

German engraver (1630–1696)

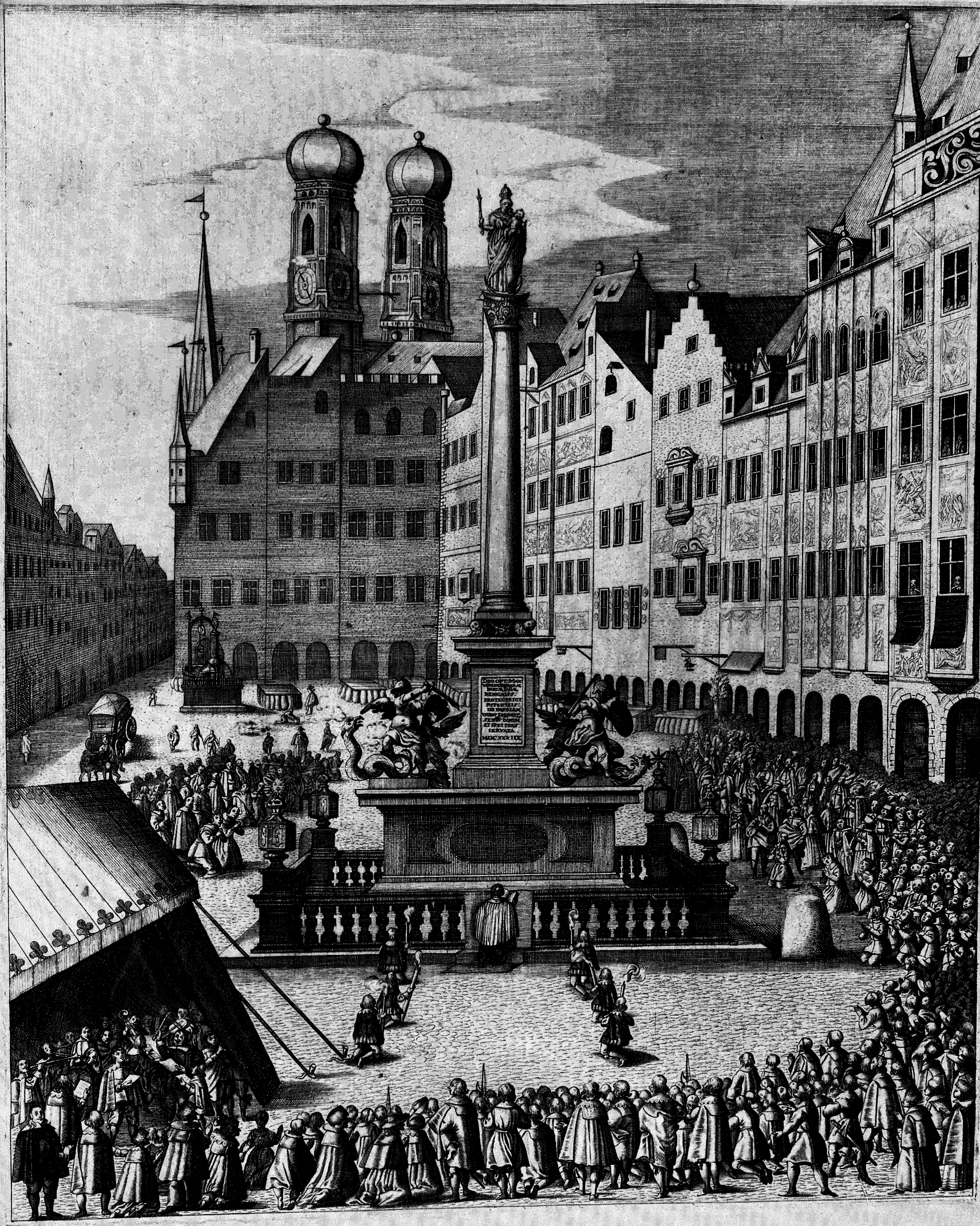
Catholic mass on the Marienplatz in München, around the Pillar of Mary, a symbol of the counter-reformational cult of Mary. In the tent, singers are singing, led by the conductor with a baton.

Bartholomäus Kilian (1630–1696), was a German engraver and member of the Kilian family of engravers.

== Biography ==
He was born in Augsburg as the son of Wolfgang Kilian and besides being a pupil of his father, he trained with the engravers Matthäus Merian the Younger in Frankfurt am Main, and François de Poilly in Paris. He was the younger brother of Philipp Kilian.

He died in Augsburg.

== Sources ==
- Bartholomäus Kilian on Artnet
