= Lucas Kilian =

German engraver (1579–1637)

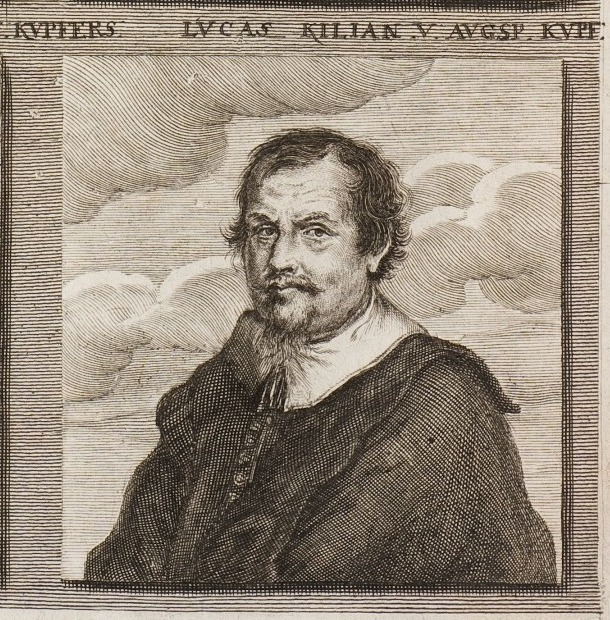
- Portrait in the Teutsche Academie (1683)
- Born: 1579; Augsburg, Germany
- Died: 1637 (aged 57–58); Augsburg, Germany
- Known for: Engraving
- Family: Kilian family

Lucas Kilian (Lucas Kilianus Augustanus; 1579–1637) was a German engraver and etcher from the Kilian family of engravers in Augsburg. He became renowned as an engraver in the city of Augsburg working for the Custos workshop founded by his step father. He produced portraits, mythological drawings as well as anatomical illustrations.

== Biography ==
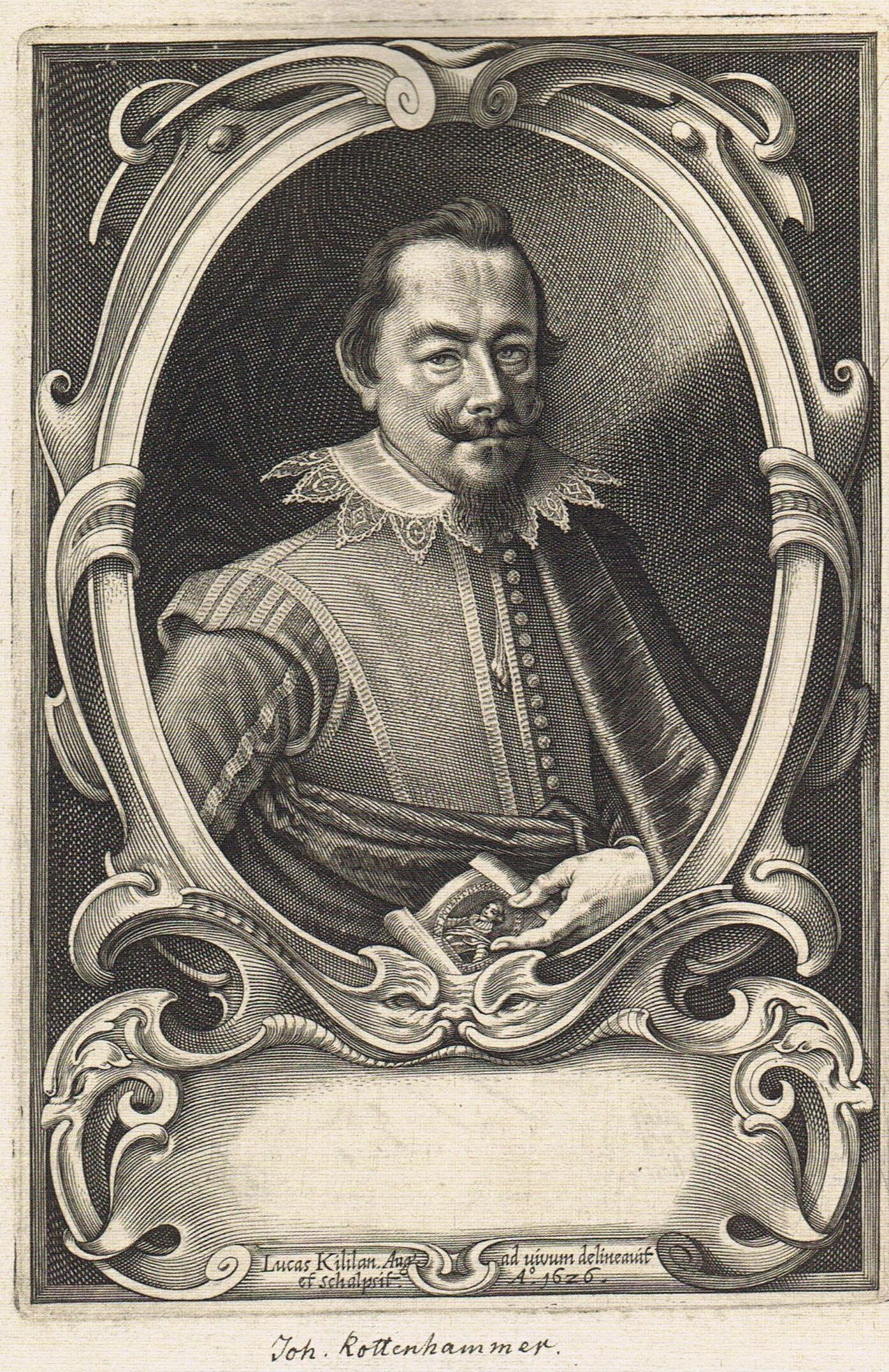
Portrait of Johann Fürleger by Lucas Kilian

Kilian was born in Augsburg, the son of Silesian goldsmith Bartholomaus Kilian the elder and Maria Pfeiffelmann. After his father's death in 1588, his mother remarried Dominicus Custos and he and his brother Wolfgang became his pupils. He also trained in Venice from 1601 to 1604 under Hendrick Goltzius and worked briefly in the printing shop of Giusto Sadeler. He returned to Augsburg to work with Wolfgang following the death of his step father. He specialized in portraits, mythology and ornaments. Kilian's engraved portrait of Albrecht Dürer, based on a Dürer self-portrait from a copy of Dürer's Feast of the Rosary by Johann Rottenhammer, "became one of the best-known representations of Dürer to posterity." He is also known for his engravings after Cornelis Cornelisz. van Haarlem. His anatomy broadsides, Catoptri Microcosmici ('Mirrors of the Microcosm'), produced after designs by the medical doctor Johannes Remmelin and published by Stephan Michelspacher, were much reprinted after their original publication in 1613, including a 1615 pamphlet, a 1619 book, reprints in German, Latin, Dutch and English, as well as a 1754 Italian plagiarism. Another famous work was a detailed bird's eye view cityscape of Augsburg produced in 1626. Lucas and Wolfgang had prominent patrons in Philipp Hainhofer and the Fugger family. Nearly 1050 works have been identified as being made by Lucas. Lucas married Barbara Miller (d. 1620) in 1604 and died in Augsburg in 1637. The family business declined following the Thirty Years War but the next generation, led by Wolfgang's sons Bartholomäus and Philipp Kilian who trained in France and Italy became book illustrators in the baroque style.

== Sources ==
- Lucas Kilian on Artnet
- Biography
