= Dominicus Custos =

Flemish artist, printer and copperplate engraver (1560–1612)

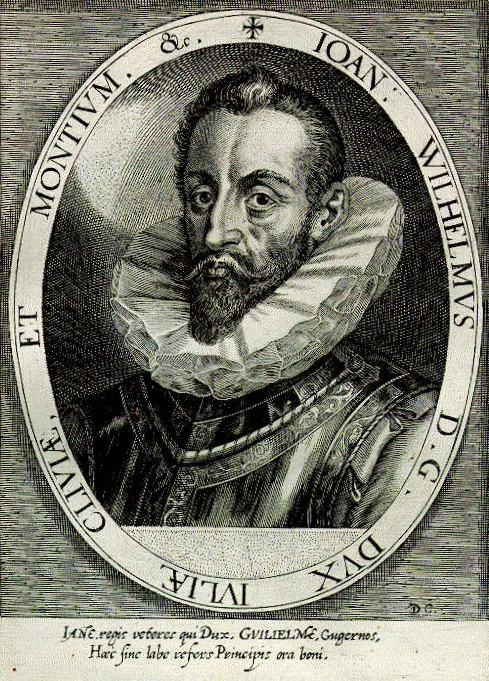
John William, Duke of Jülich-Cleves-Berg by Dominicus Custos

Dominicus Custos (1560–1612) was a Flemish artist, printer and copperplate engraver, who worked in the service of Emperor Rudolph II in Prague.

Dominicus was born in Antwerp, the son of Pieter Balten, and settled in Augsburg as the second husband of the widow of Bartholomäus Kilian (1548–1588), a goldsmith from Silesia and the father of Wolfgang and Lukas Kilian; they were trained by Dominicus in the art of engraving after their father's death. Dominicus was the father of David Custodis, also an Augsburg engraver.

Custos and the humanist Marcus Henning collaborated in producing the work "Tirolensium principum comitum" which appeared in 1599 and depicted 28 Counts of Tyrol from Albert IV (1190–1253) to Rudolf II (1552–1612). Custos was responsible for the engravings while Henning took care of the text and eulogies. (see The Spanish Hall at Schloss Ambras)

Between 1600 and 1602 he published the "Atrium heroicum" in four parts. This was a collection of 171 engraved portraits of rulers, nobles, statesmen, dignitaries, celebrities, military leaders and important businessmen of the 16th century, and was the equivalent of a modern Who's Who. Custos' stepsons, Wolfgang and Lukas assisted in the work, and later his three own sons contributed. Portraits from his previous collections "Fuggerorum et Fuggerarum Imagine" (1593) and "Tirolensium principum comitum Eicon" (1599) were included. The wide geographical coverage of his work is noteworthy – many European and even some eastern countries are represented. The work, with a few exceptions, is completely dominated by male notables. The Latin inscriptions were again penned by Marcus Henning of Augsburg, since Custos had little proficiency in the language.

In 1605 he published a collection of engraved portraits of scholars, Clarissimorum aliquot litteris, ingenio, fama virorum effigies (Augsburg, Christophorus Mangus, 1605).

Custos also produced "Armamentarium Heroicum", a collection of 125 engravings after drawings by Giovanni Battista Fontana, and showing the arms collection of Archduke Ferdinand of Tyrol who had started an arms museum in Ambras Palace near Innsbruck. The plates are accompanied by biographical text on the original owners of the armour and written by the Archduke's secretary, Jacob Schrenck von Notzing.

Custos died in Augsburg. His sons Raphael, David and Jacob Custos continued his workshop.

== Sources ==
- Die Elogien der Ambraser Fürstenbildnisse: Die Kupferstiche des Dominicus Custos (1599) : Leben und Werk ihres Autors Marcus Henning (Commentationes Aenipontanae) – Walter Dietl, Universitätsverlag Wagner (2000) ISBN 3-7030-0350-2 ISBN 978-3703003509
- Cranach – Drusse – F.W.H. Hollstein (Menno Hertzberger, Amsterdam 1959)
