= Philipp Kilian =

German engraver (1628–1693)

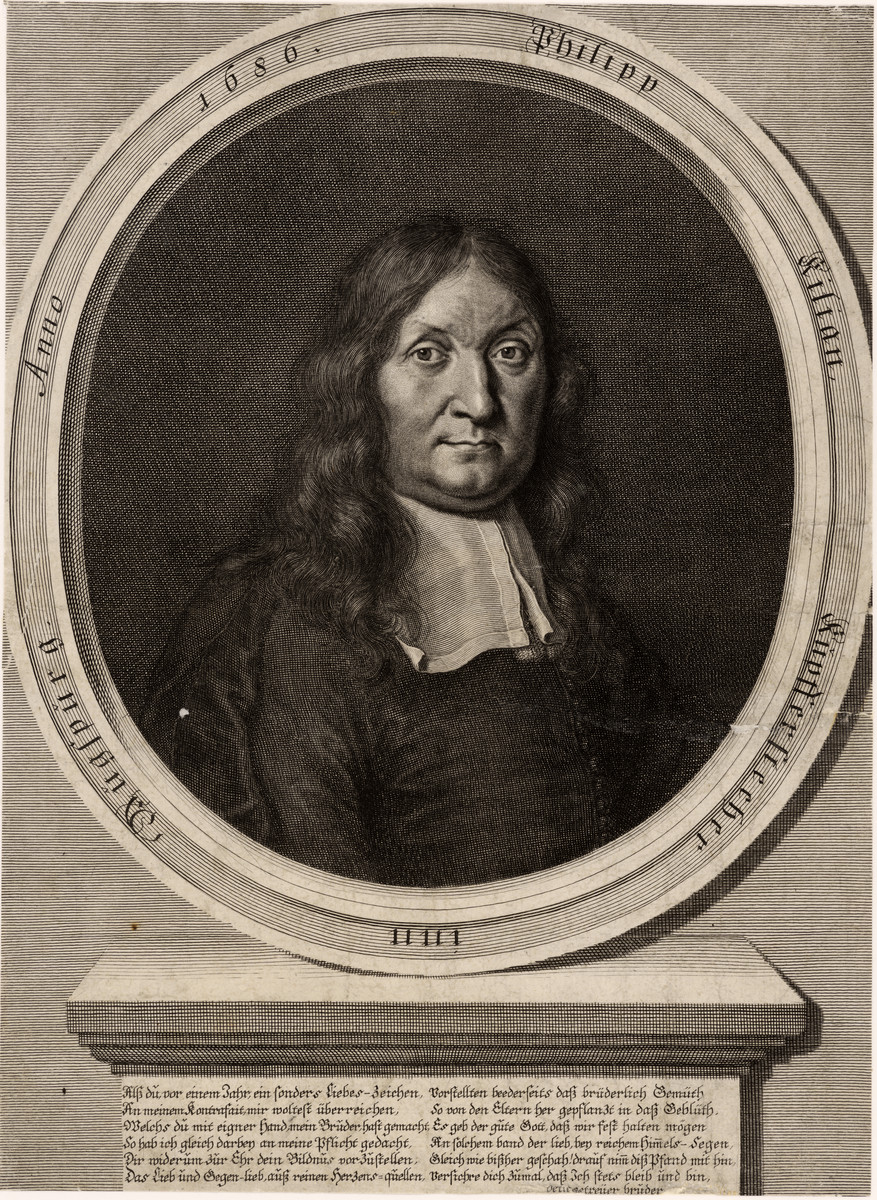
Philipp Kilian, 1686

Philipp Kilian (1628 – 1693) was a German Baroque engraver.

== Biography ==
According to Houbraken, he engraved the portrait of Johann Heinrich Roos, which Roos' teacher Barent Graat sent him when he was writing his Schouburgh. Kilian made the engraving for Joachim von Sandrart, whose Teutsche Academie he illustrated.

According to the RKD, he was the son of the engraver Wolfgang Kilian, and brother to Bartholomaus. Besides engraving Sandrart's portrait, he made engravings after paintings by Karel Skreta, Philippe de Champaigne, and Johann Carl Loth.

== Sources ==
- Philipp Kilian on Sandrart.net
