= Stephan Michelspacher =

Tyrolean printmaker

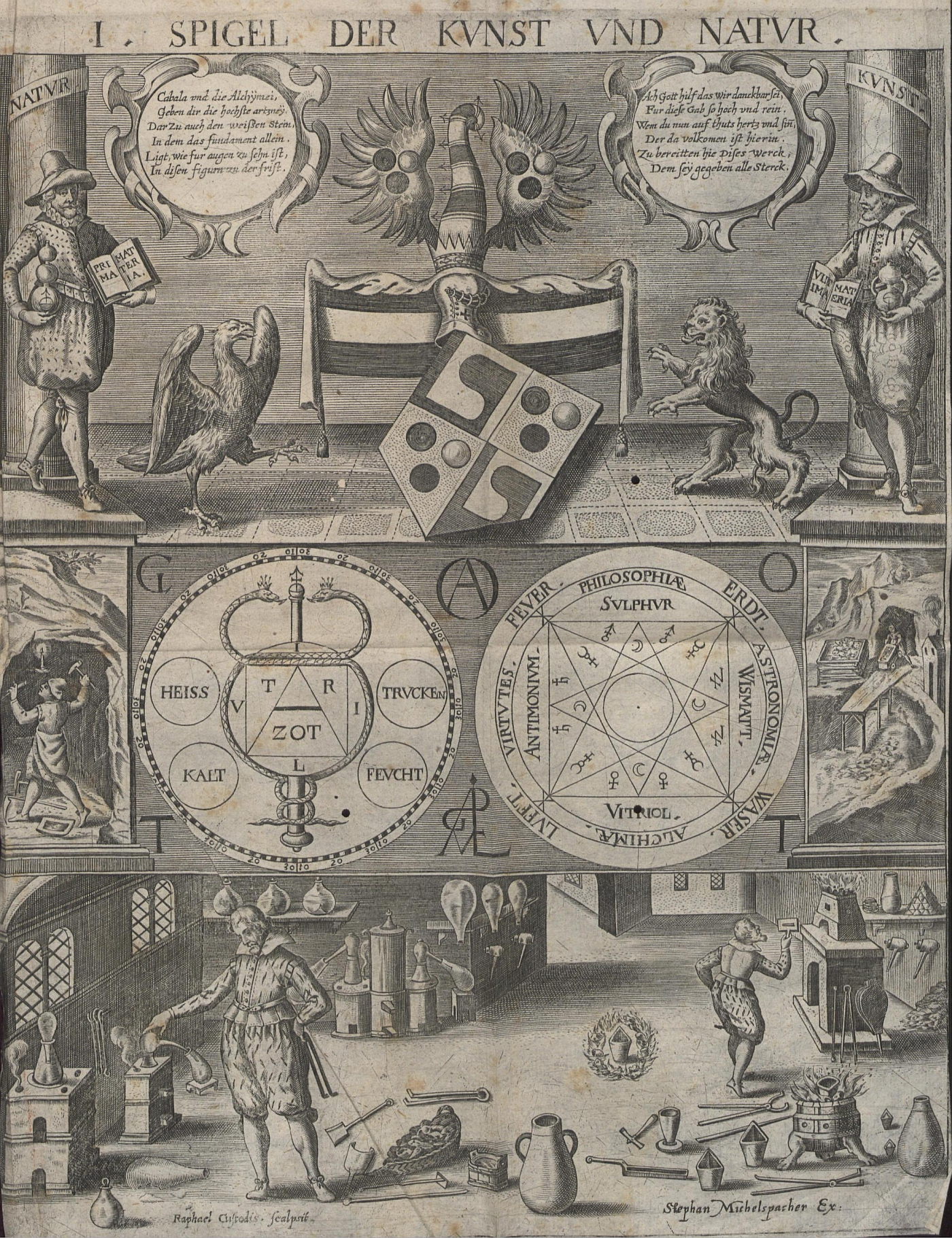
Print from Cabala, Spiegel der Kunst und Natur: in Alchymia

Stephan Michelspacher was a Tyrolean printmaker active in Augsburg during the early seventeenth century.

Michelspacher was a paracelsian physician living in Tyrol. Alinda van Ackooy has suggested that as a Lutheran he left Tyrol in around 1613 owing to the Catholic Renewal promoted by the Habsburgs. Augsburg also was a centre of the print industry, in which Michelspacher was to participate.

In Augsburg, on becoming a printmaker, he published Cabala, Spiegel der Kunst und Natur: in Alchymia in 1615. The book is noted for its selection of hermetic inspired prints.

He collaborated with Johann Remmelin on an anatomical work, Pinax microcosmographicus.

== Gallery ==
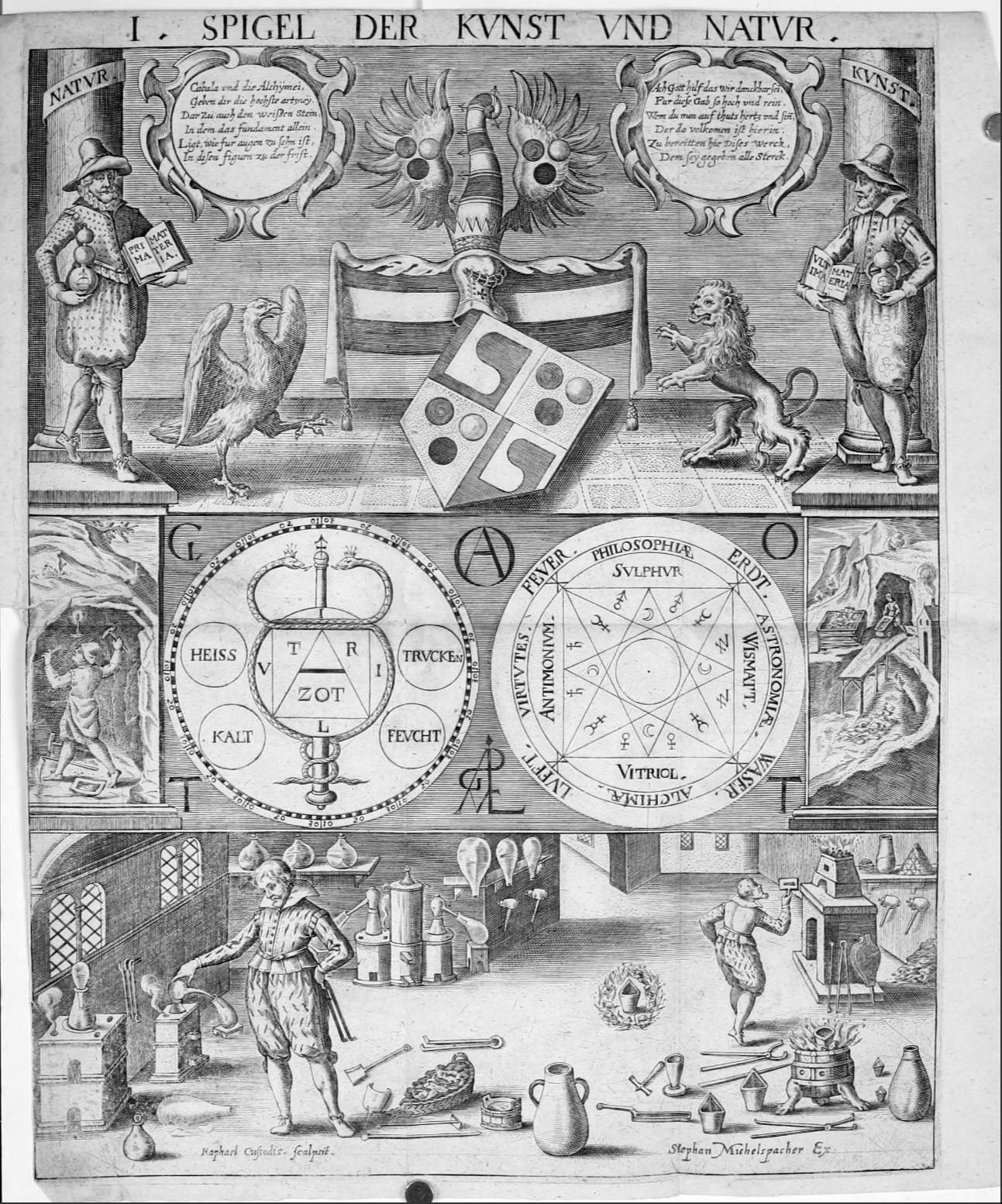
Illustration 1 from Spiegel der Kunst und Natur in Alchymia 1663

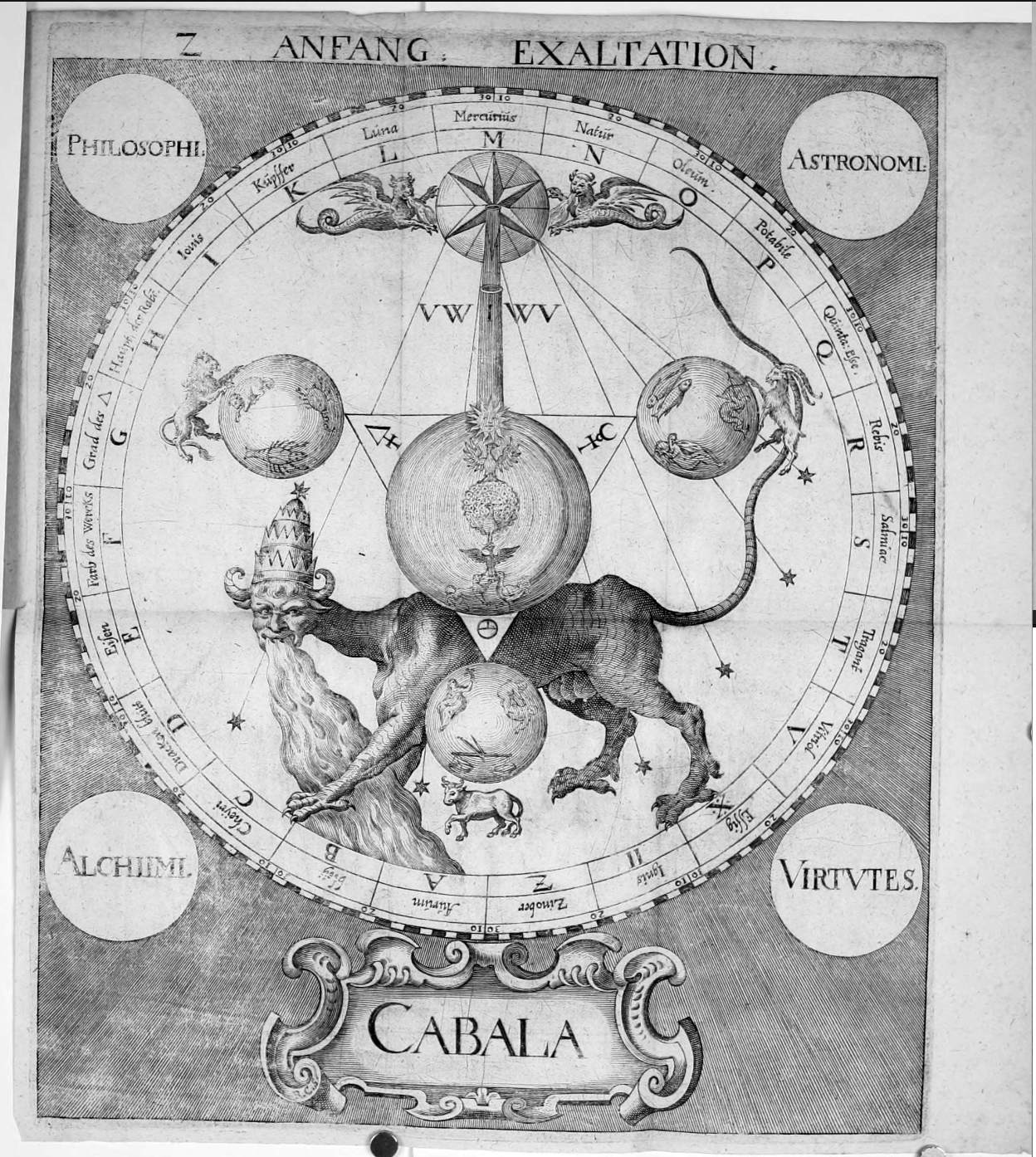
Illustration 2 from Spiegel der Kunst und Natur in Alchymia 1663

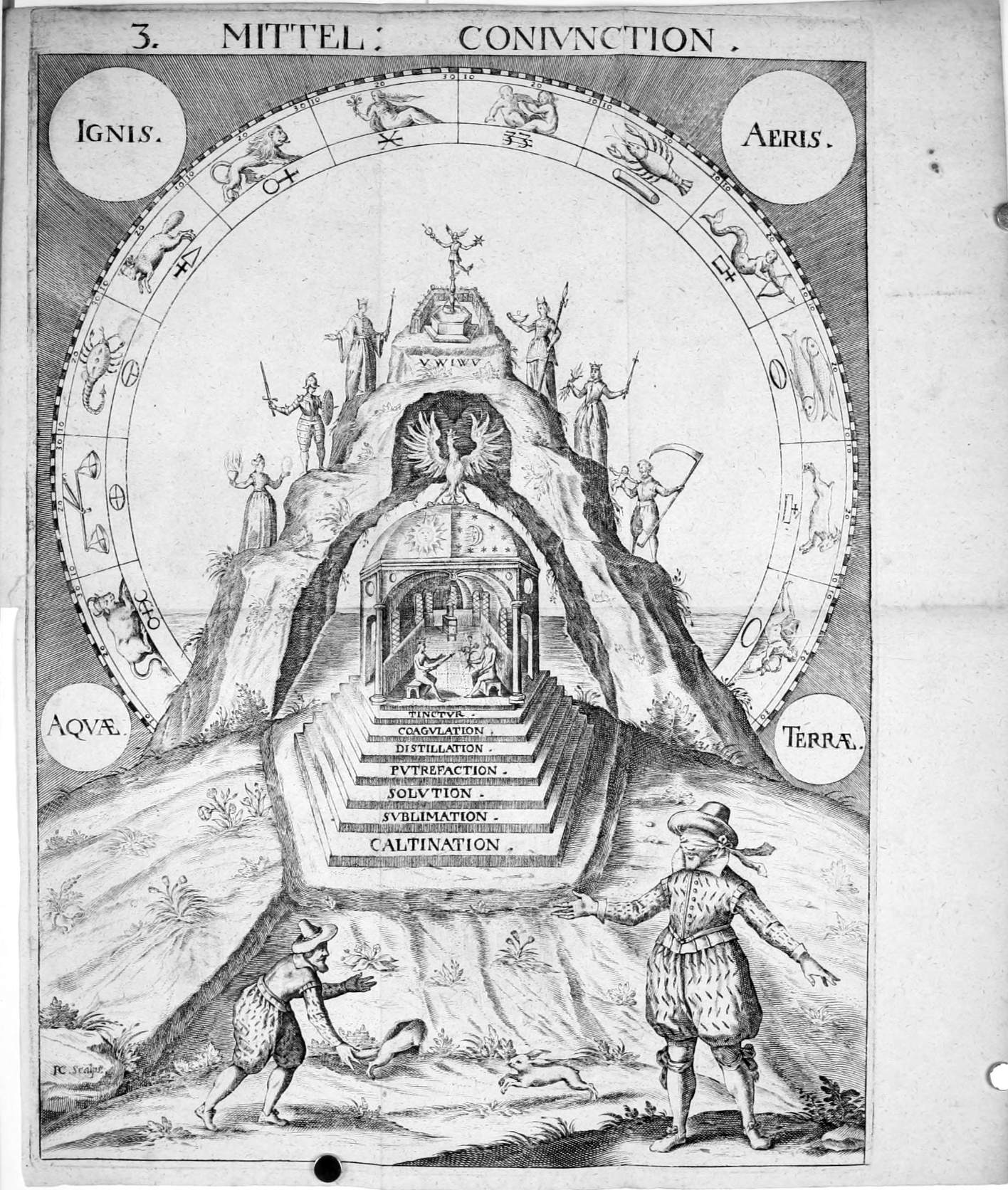
Illustration 3 from Spiegel der Kunst und Natur in Alchymia 1663

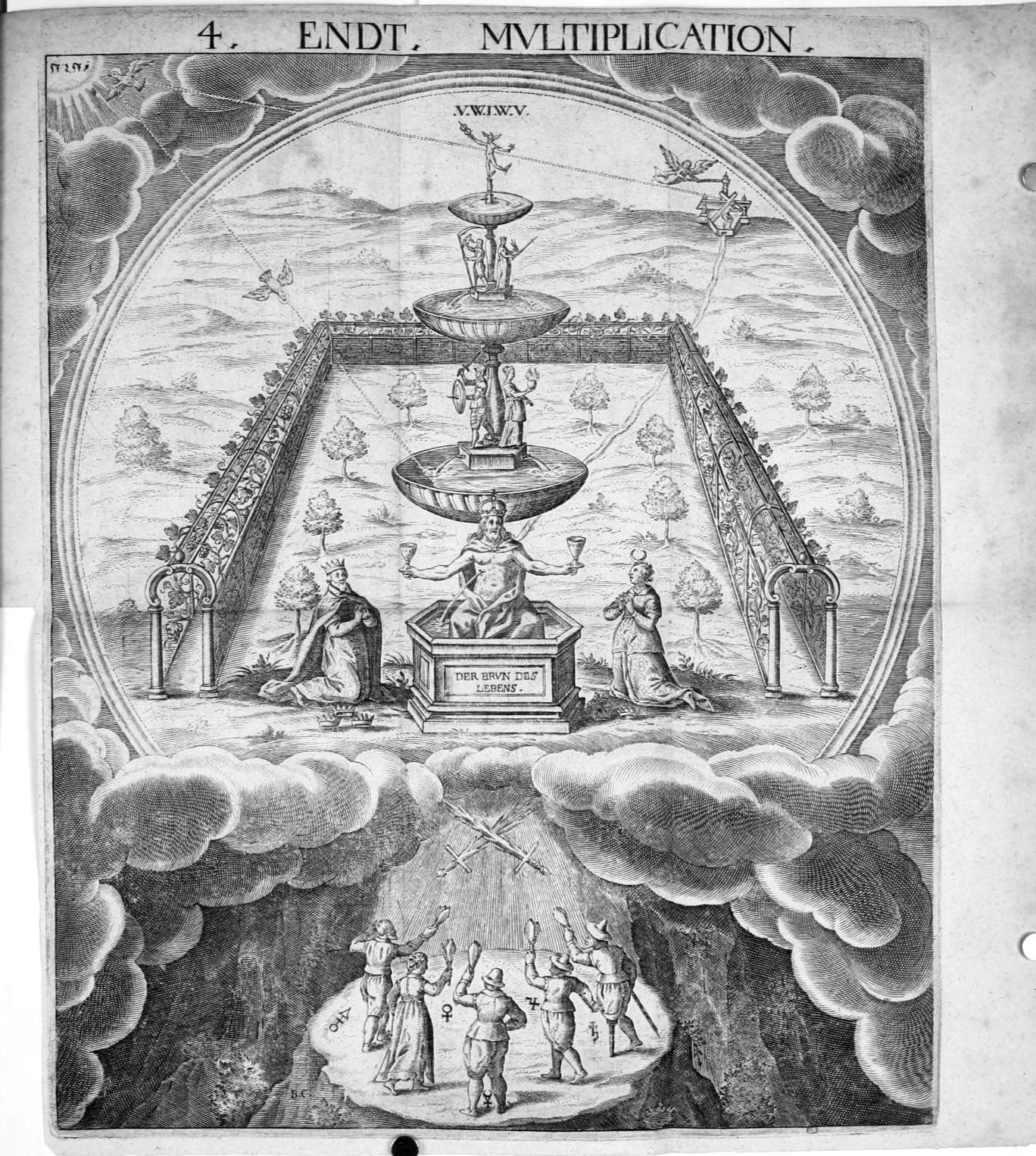
Illustration 4 from Spiegel der Kunst und Natur in Alchymia 1663
