= Wolfgang Kilian =

German engraver (1581–1662)

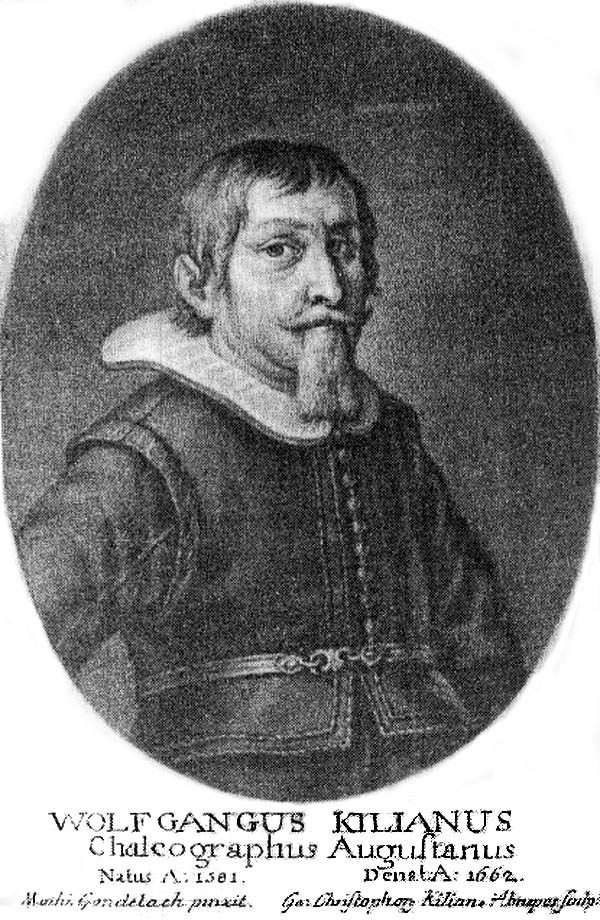
- Wolfgang Kilian, by Georg Christoph Kilian
- Born: 10 May 1581; Augsburg
- Died: 1662 (aged 80–81); Augsburg
- Known for: Engraving
- Family: Kilian family

Wolfgang Kilian (10 May 1581 – 1662) was a German engraver and member of the Kilian family of engravers in Augsburg.

== Biography ==
He was the son of Bartholomaus Kilian the elder and Maria Pfeiffelmann. After his father's death in 1583, his mother remarried Dominicus Custos and he and his brother Lucas became his pupils.

From 1604 to 1608, he travelled in Italy and worked in Venice, Mantua, and Milan. On his return, he married and continued in the family workshop. He was the father of the engravers Bartholomaus the younger and Philipp.

== Sources ==
- Wolfgang Kilian on Artnet
