= Romanesque secular and domestic architecture =

Period of architectural design

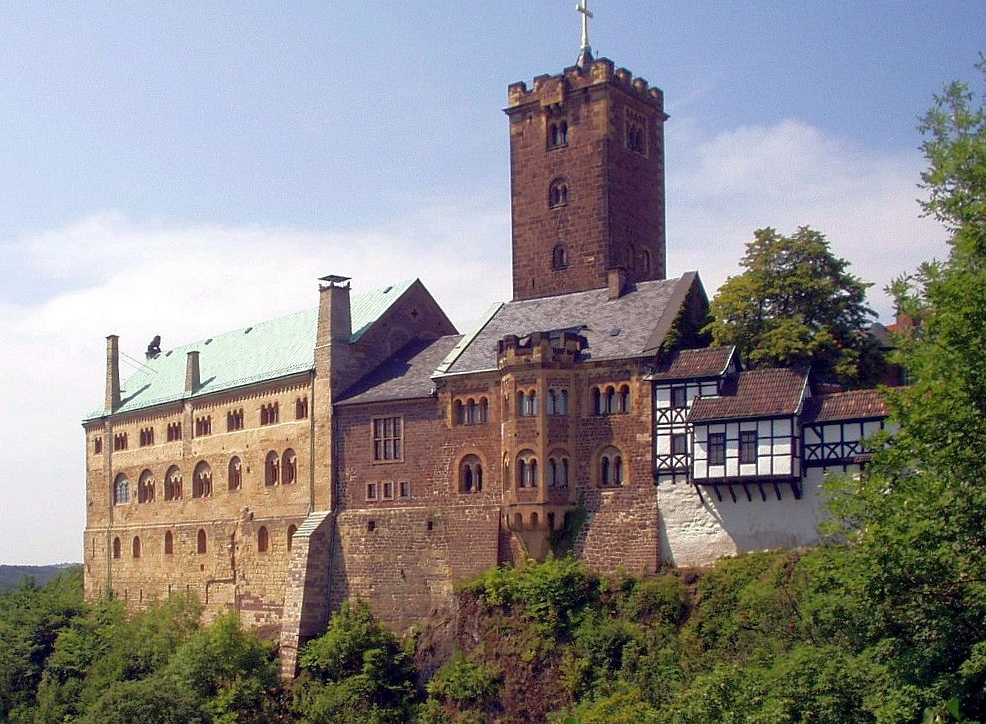
The heavily restored Romanesque castle of Wartburg gives an impression of the way it might have appeared in the 12th and 13th centuries

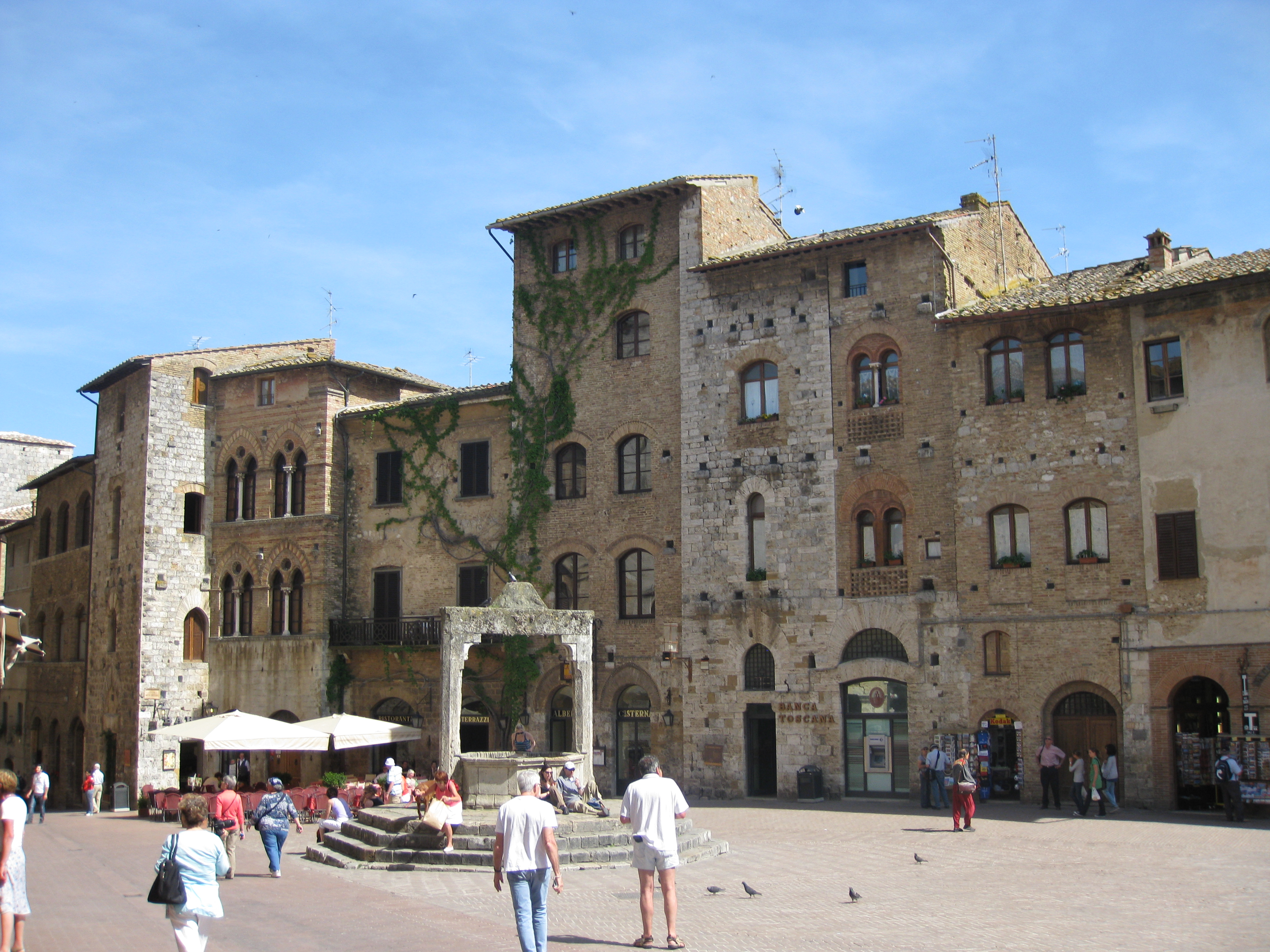
Medieval buildings surrounding the Piazza della Cisterna in San Gimignano include a Romanesque building with an automated telling machine set into its portal.

Romanesque architecture is an architectural style of medieval Europe characterised by semi-circular arches. The term "Romanesque" is usually used for the period from the 10th to the 12th century with "Pre-Romanesque" and "First Romanesque" being applied to earlier buildings with Romanesque characteristics. Romanesque architecture can be found across the continent, diversified by regional materials and characteristics, but with an overall consistency that makes it the first pan-European architectural style since Imperial Roman Architecture. The Romanesque style in England is traditionally referred to as Norman architecture.

The commonest surviving Romanesque buildings are churches, of which many are still standing, more or less intact and frequently in use. Many of these churches were built as abbeys, to serve religious communities. The living quarters and other monastic buildings of these abbeys constitute a significant part of the remaining domestic architecture of the Romanesque period.

The second most common type of surviving Romanesque building is the castle, of which the great majority are in ruins, as a result of war, or the practice of dismantling castles that might later be used in uprisings. A number of ruined or much altered imperial palaces, some of them within castle walls, others unfortified, have also survived in Germany and Alsace.

Examples of purely domestic architecture include the great hall of a fortified manor in England, and a small number of large town houses in France and Germany and several palazzos in Venice. A great many more small houses are spread across Europe, often greatly altered by the insertion of later windows, and sometimes with their antiquity unrecognised and unrecorded.

== History ==
The following is a summary of essential points from the section History in the article cited above.

=== Origins ===
Romanesque architecture was the first distinctive style to spread across Europe since the Roman Empire. Architecture of a Romanesque style developed simultaneously in the north of Italy, parts of France and in the Iberian Peninsula in the 10th century.

=== Politics and religion ===
The Romanesque period was a time of frequent conflict. Much of Europe was affected by feudalism in which peasants held tenure from local rulers over the land that they farmed in exchange for military service and employment on building projects. This resulted in the building of castles at strategic points, many of them being constructed as strongholds of the Normans, descendants of the Vikings who invaded northern France in 911. The invasion of England by William II, Duke of Normandy, in 1066, saw the building of both castles and abbeys which reinforced the Norman presence. Political struggles also resulted in the fortification of many towns, or the rebuilding and strengthening of walls that remained from the Roman period. One of the most notable surviving fortifications is that of the city of Carcassonne. The enclosure of towns brought about a lack of living space within the walls, and resulted in a style of town house that was tall and narrow, often surrounding communal courtyards, as at San Gimignano in Tuscany.

In Germany, the Holy Roman Emperors built a number of residences both castles and palaces, at strategic points and on trade routes. The Imperial Palace of Goslar (heavily restored in the 19th century) was built in the early 11th century by Otto III and Henry III, while the ruined Palace at Gelnhausen was received by Frederick Barbarossa prior to 1170. The movement of people and armies also brought about the building of bridges, some of which have survived, including the 12th-century bridge at Besalú, Catalonia, the 11th-century Puente de la Reina, Navarre and the Pont-Saint-Bénézet, Avignon.

The system of monasticism in which the religious become members of an order, with common ties and a common rule, living in a mutually dependent community, rather than as a group of hermits living in proximity but essentially separate, was established by the monk Benedict in the 6th century. From this time onwards, monasteries were established across Europe, bringing about not only the construction of large churches, but also cloisters, domestic quarters and other buildings associated with community living such as hospitals, barns, and forges.

The Crusades, 1095–1270, which were intended to wrest the Holy Places of Palestine from Islamic control, resulted in the building of castles in Syria and Palestine. The Crusades brought about a very large movement of people and, with them, ideas and trade skills, particularly those involved in the building of fortifications and the metal working needed for the provision of arms, which was also applied to the fitting and decoration of buildings. The continual movement of people, rulers, nobles, bishops, abbots, craftsmen and peasants, was an important factor in creating a homogeneity in building methods and a recognizable Romanesque style, despite regional differences.

Politics

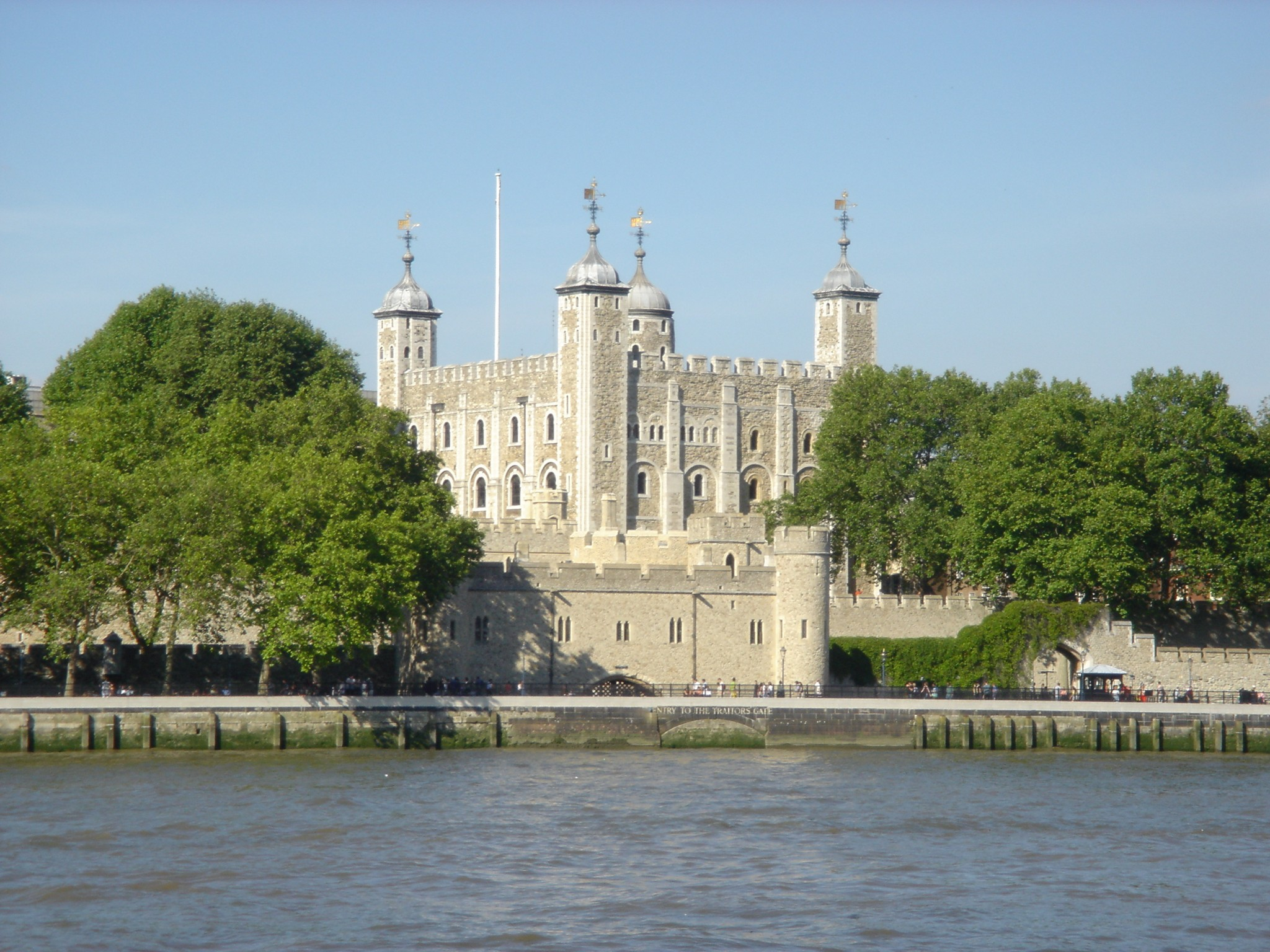
The Tower of London, (1078). William the Conqueror built the central White Tower as his stronghold and residence.

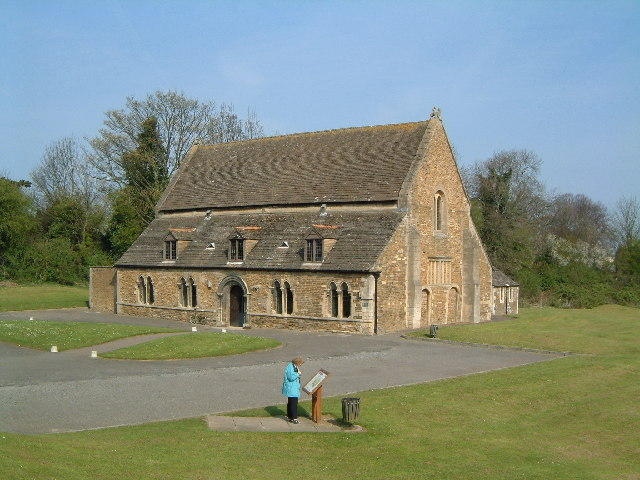
The Great Hall of Oakham Castle, England, once part of the fortified manor of a Norman baron.

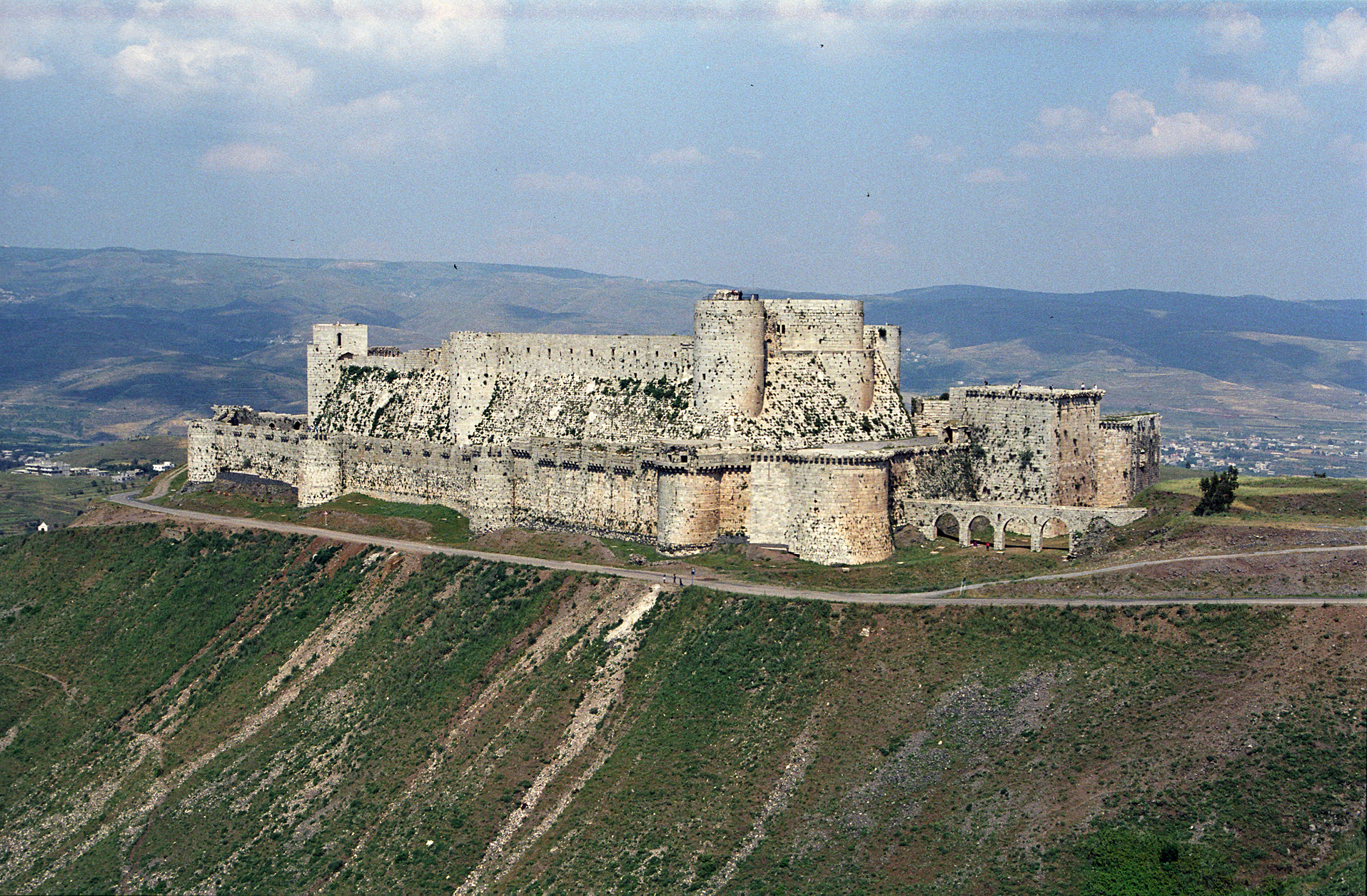
Crusader castle, Krak des Chevaliers, Syria, was mainly constructed in this period, with the outer walls being later.

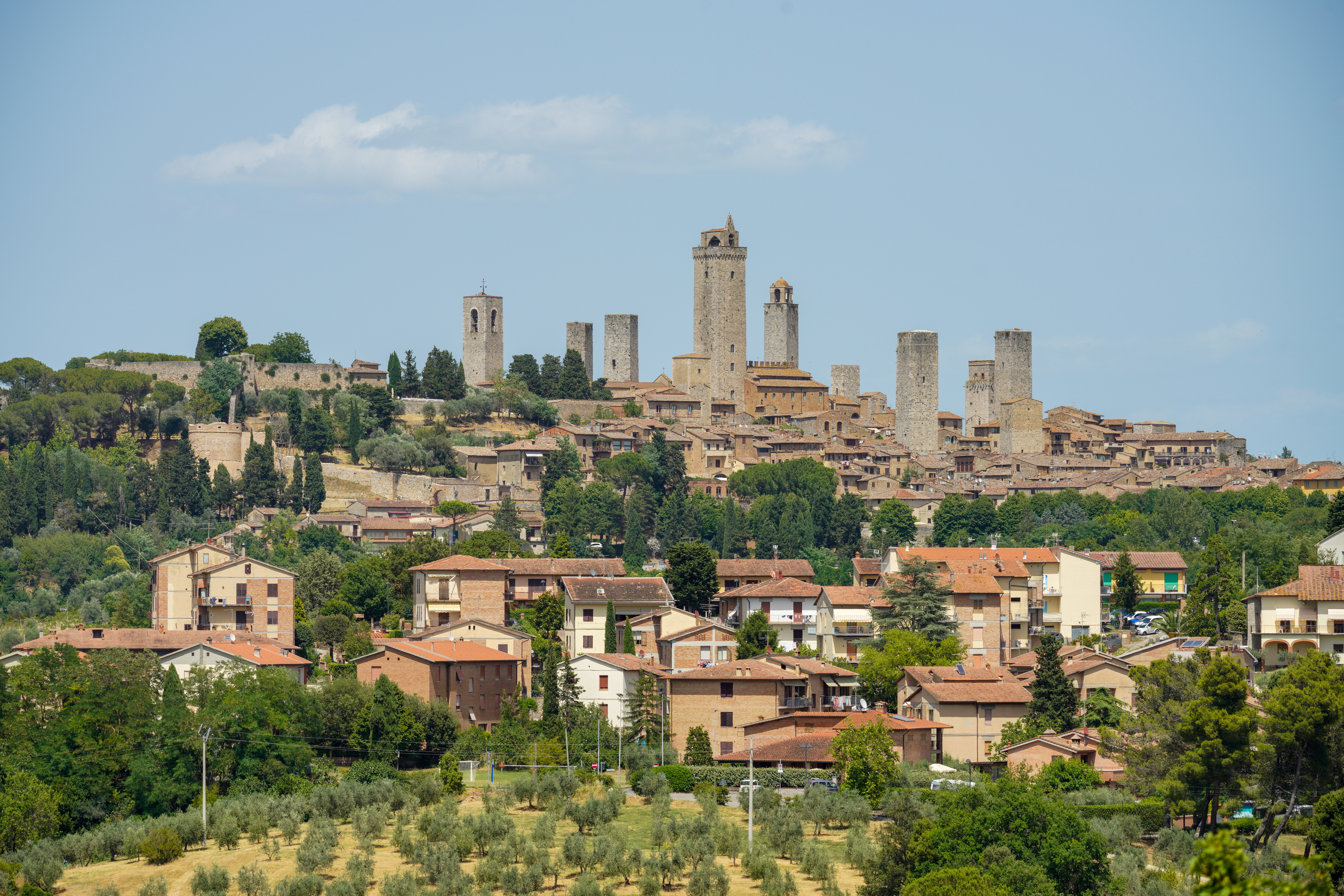
Many towns, such as San Gimignano, were enclosed with walls, causing crowding and the building of tower houses.

== Characteristics ==
=== Walls and materials ===
Most domestic buildings of the Romanesque period were built of wood, or partly of wood. In Scandinavian countries, buildings were often entirely of wood, while in other parts of Europe, buildings were "half-timbered", constructed with timber frames, the spaces filled with rubble, wattle and daub, or other materials which were then plastered over. Stone was often used for basements. The building material differs greatly across Europe, depending upon the local stone and building traditions.

While in most countries stone is the usual material for substantial buildings such as castles and palaces, in much of Poland, Germany, northern Italy and the Netherlands, brick is more commonly used. Where stone has been used for domestic buildings, it is often in comparatively small and irregular pieces, bedded in thick mortar. Smooth ashlar masonry was used where easily worked limestone was available. For defensive buildings such as castles, the walls are massively thick. In all Romanesque architecture, the windows tend to be small. The general impression of Romanesque architecture is of solidity and strength.

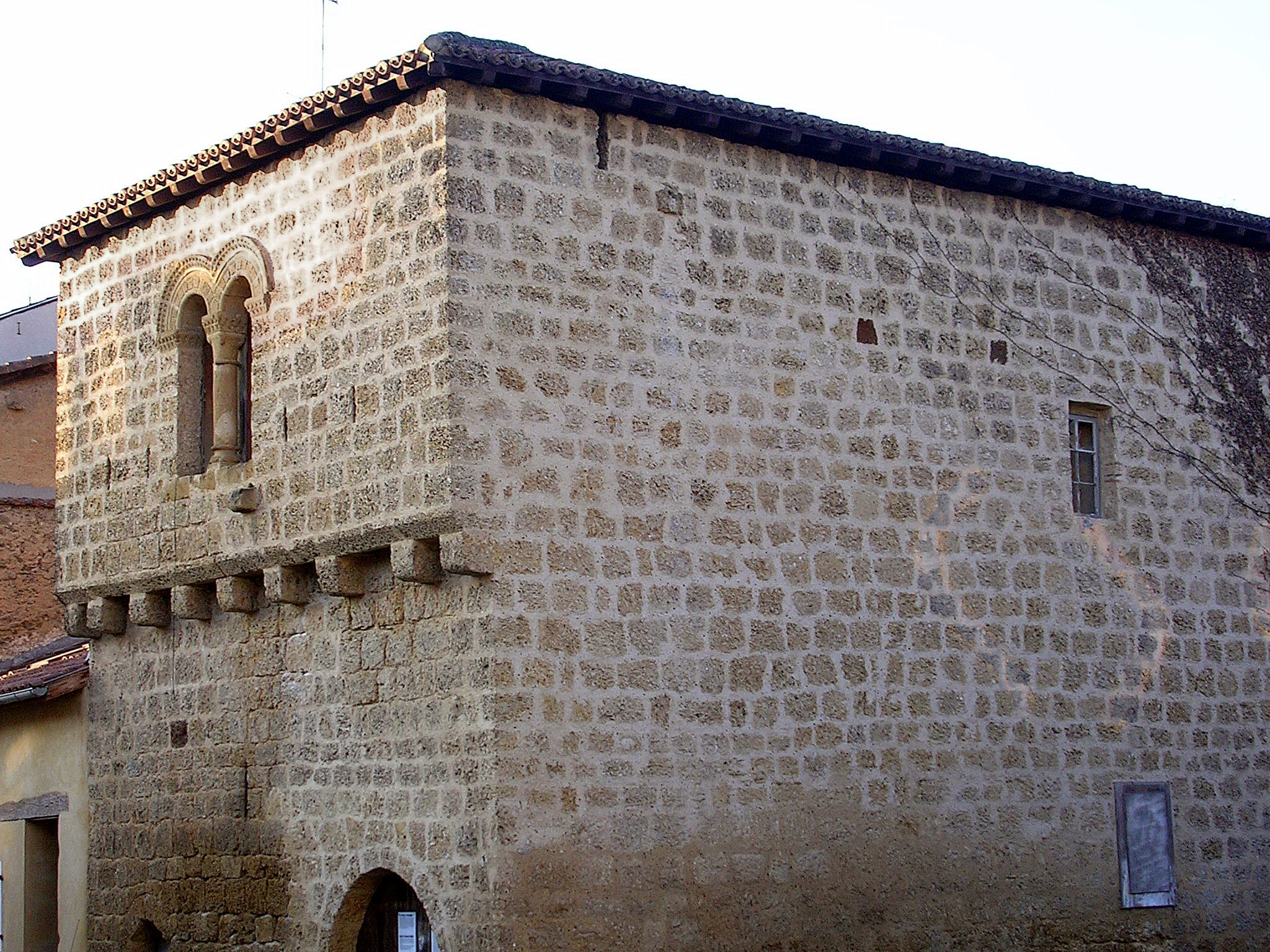
Irregularly shaped hewn blocks and thick mortar at a town house, in Mont-de-Marsan. This house has a jettied upper floor supported on stone corbels.

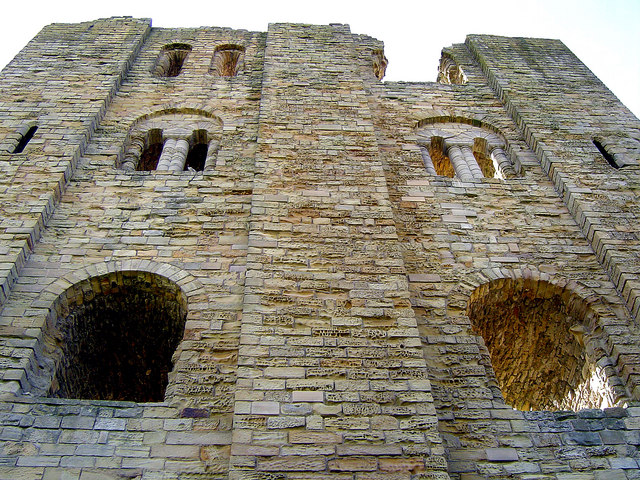
Limestone ashlar masonry in even courses at Scarborough Castle. The buttresses of low profile are characteristic of Romanesque building.

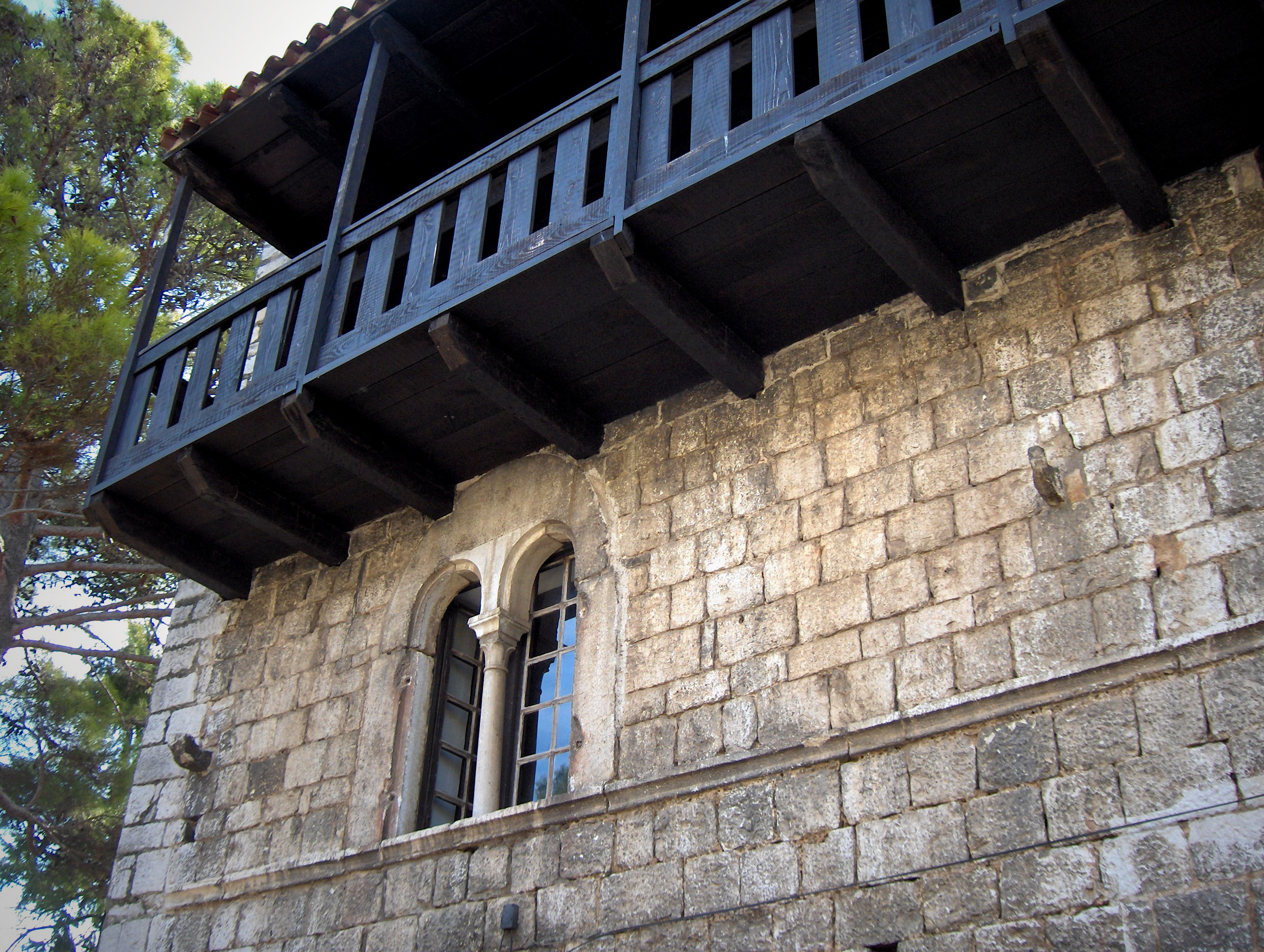
This house at Poreč, Croatia, has a reconstructed cantilevered wooden walkway, paired windows and the string course that were common features.

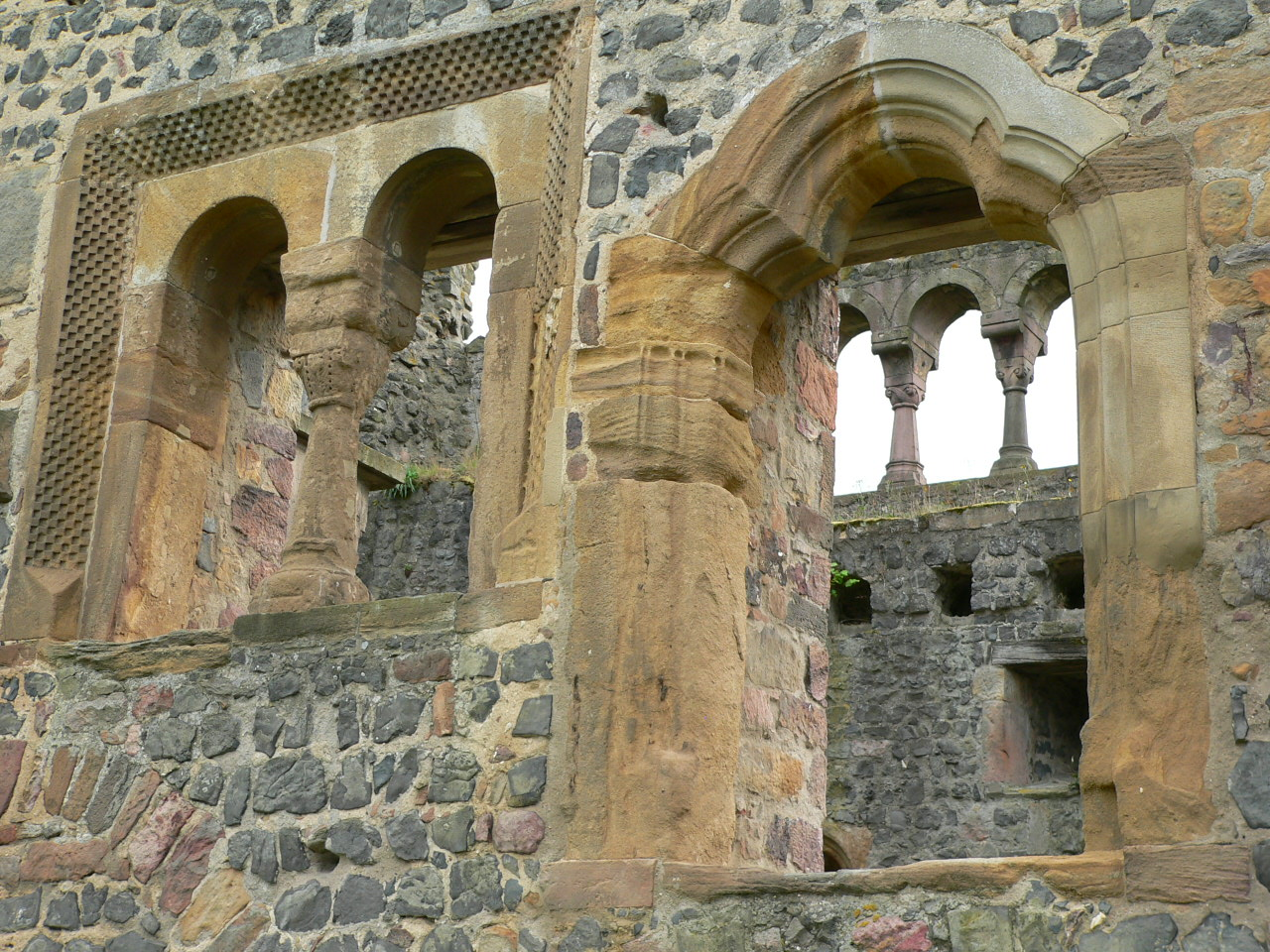
Münzenberg Palace has walls of rubble but refined detailing in its windows, the triple arch of the door and the gallery seen beyond which opens onto a vista.

=== Arches, arcades, piers and columns ===
Arches in domestic architecture across Europe during this period are always semi-circular, with the only exceptions occurring in palatial buildings in Sicily where Norman architecture was influenced by the Islamic style. Arcades (rows of arches) occur in the interior of large buildings such as the great hall of a castle, supporting the timbers of a roof or upper floor. Arcades are also used to create cloisters and loggias. Arcading on a large scale generally fulfils a structural purpose, but it is also used on a smaller scale, as a decorative feature, both internally and externally.

In Romanesque domestic architecture, arcades were most often supported on piers. They were built of masonry and are of square or rectangular section, generally having a horizontal moulding representing a capital at the springing of the arch. Columns were also used to support arcades and vaults, but are a feature of palace, civic and monastic architecture, rather than smaller houses. Colonnettes and attached shafts are also used structurally and for decoration. The capital on top of a column is usually cut so that it is round at the bottom, where it sits on the column, and square at the top where it support the arch. A capital might be undecorated, or else have foliate or figurative carving.

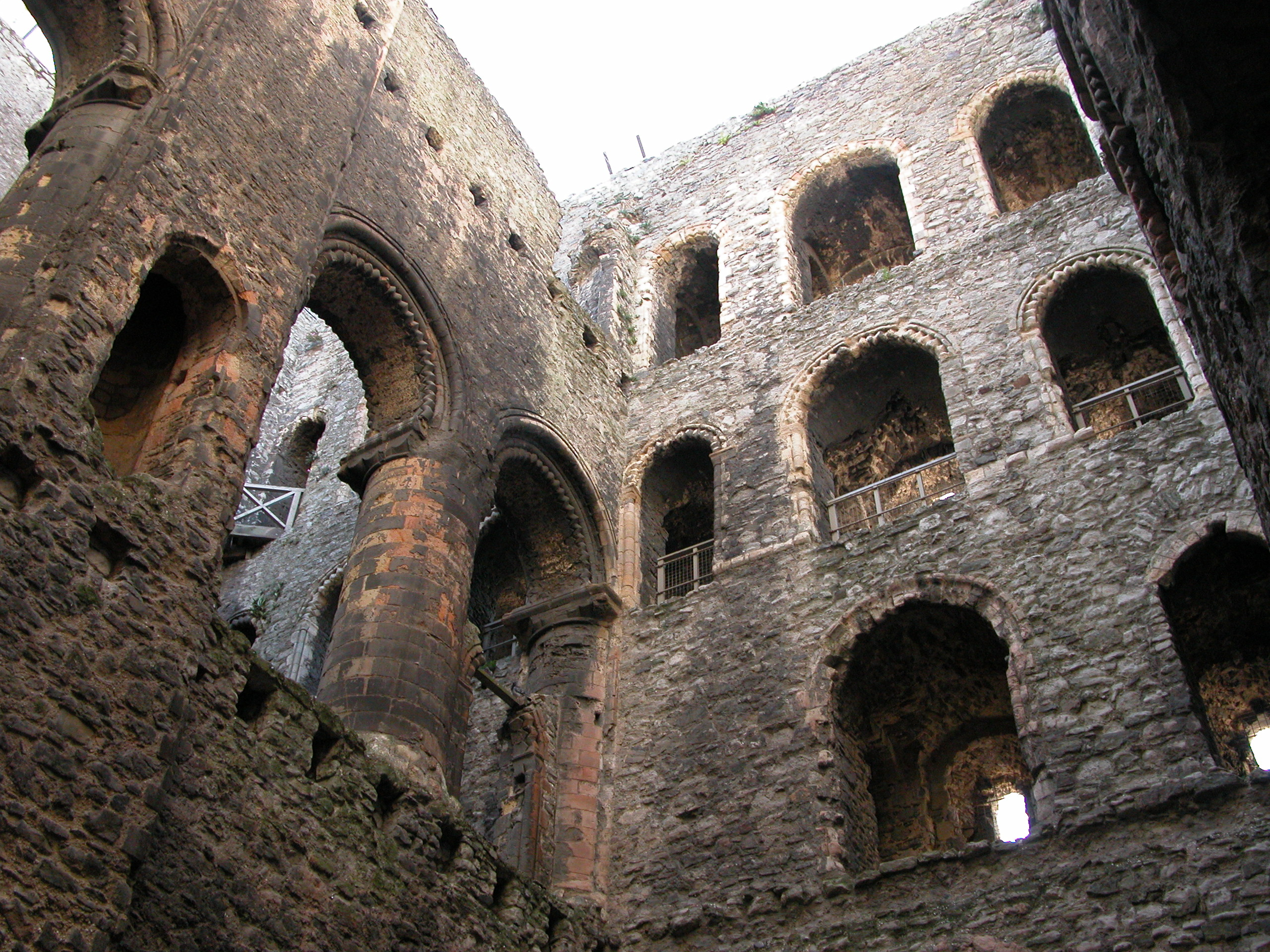
The interior of Rochester Castle, showing galleries in the interior walls and an arcade dividing the great hall.

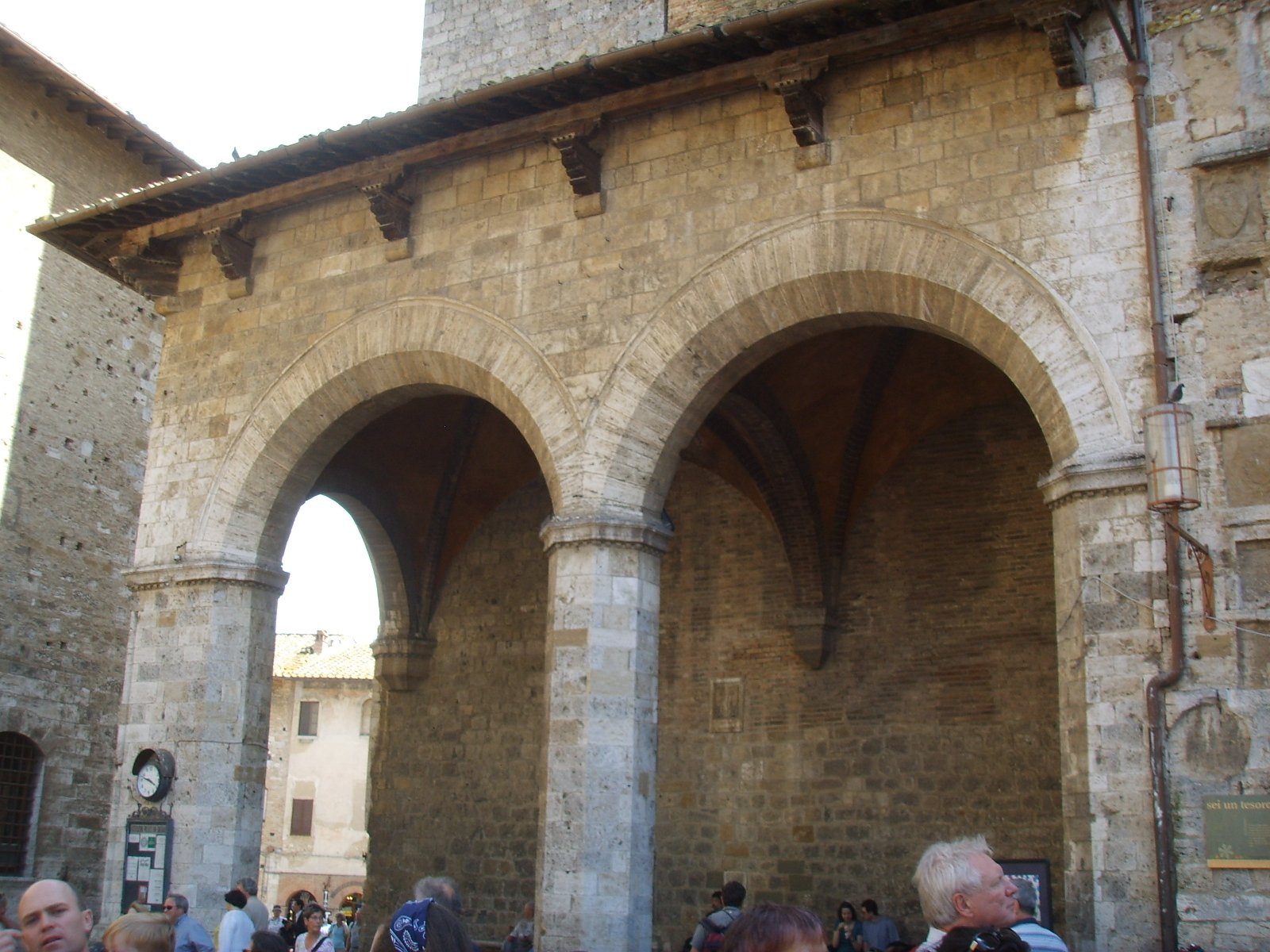
San Gimignano: the loggia on Piazza Duomo.

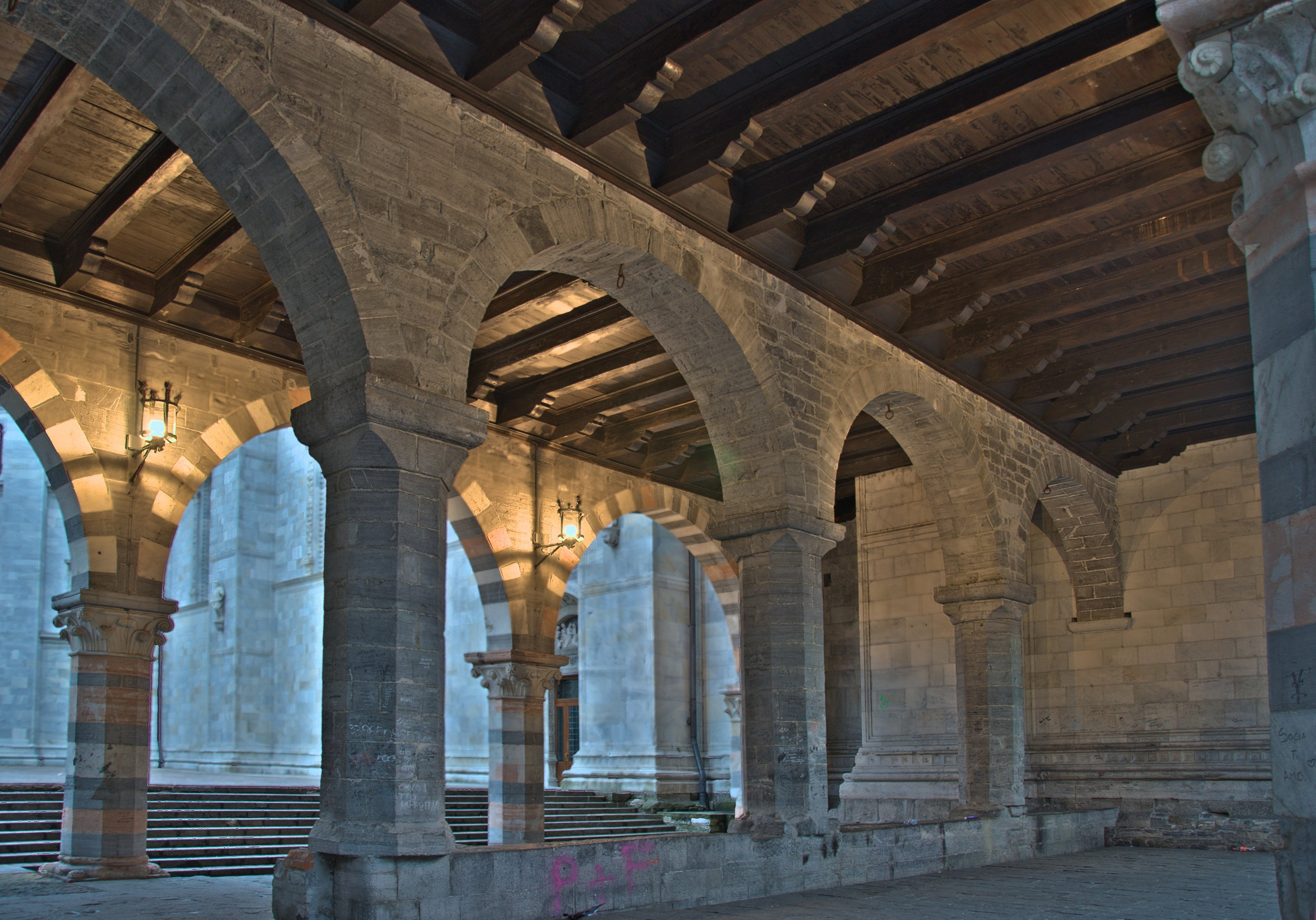
The Broletto at Como has series of arcades, the outer with polychrome voussoirs, supporting a timber roof on brackets.

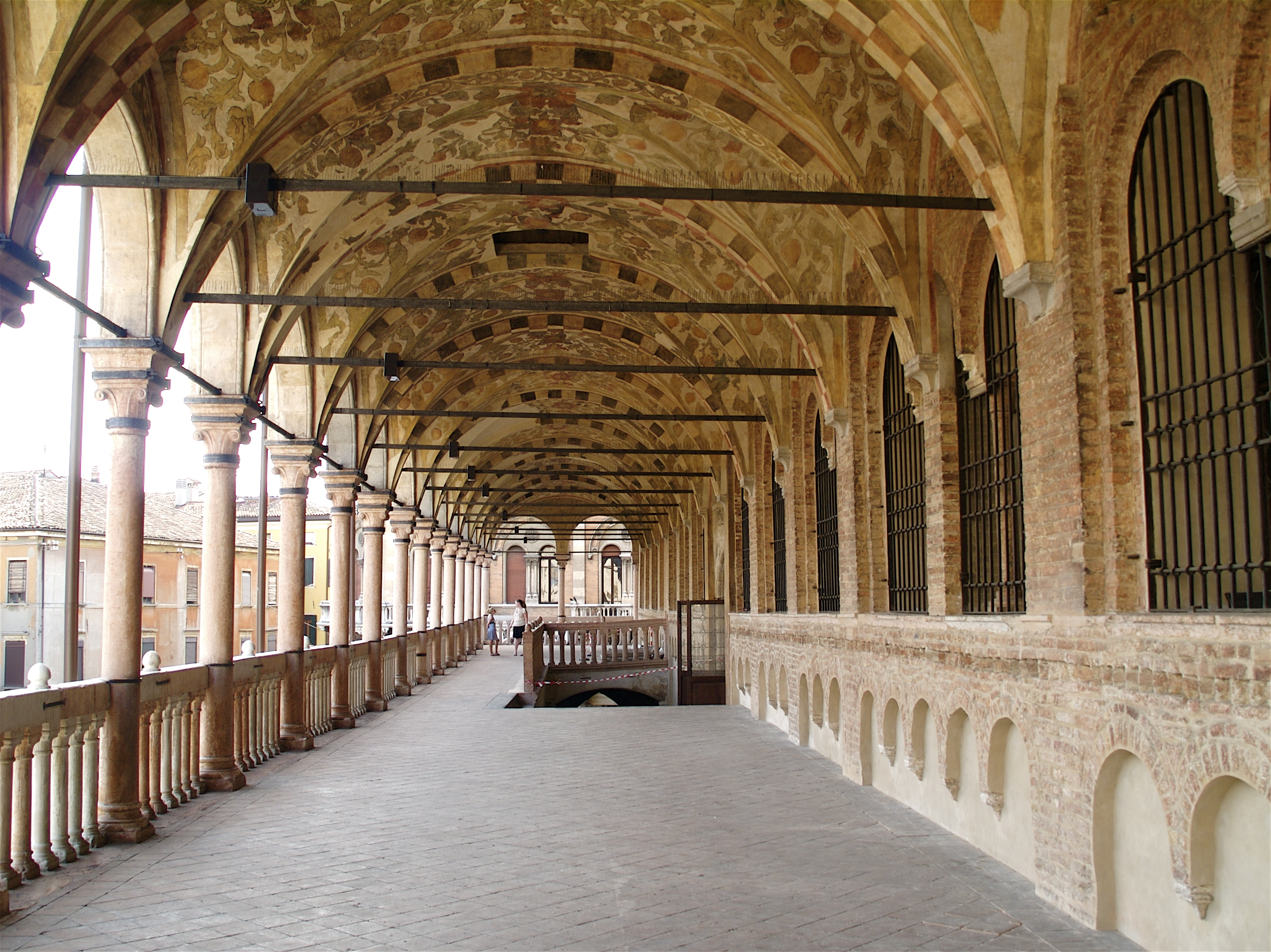
The groin vault of the upper arcade at the Palazzo della Ragione, Padua.

=== Vaults and roofs ===
Timber was used extensively in building. The majority of buildings have open wooden roofs. When building have stone undercrofts, or basements, this lower floor may be vaulted, with a barrel or groin vault. Vaulted domestic spaces are particularly found in monastic buildings, castles and palaces where skilled master masons were employed. Towards the end of the period, vaulted spaces in monastic buildings employed the ribbed vault, as it was used in abbey churches.

=== Doors and windows ===
Narrow doors and small windows are often square topped, being bridged by a solid stone lintel which may be supported on projecting brackets. Some stone buildings have retained wooden lintels. Larger doorways and windows are topped with semi-circular arches, as are arcades and vaults. Large doorways in more elaborate dwellings are often set within three archivolts or mouldings and may also have corbels or colonnettes and capitals, as at the Jew's house at Lincoln. Square-topped windows are often set in groups, with two or three beneath a single lintel. Round-topped windows are often paired under a wide arch, and separated by stone mullions or colonnettes. In Sicily there are a number of palaces and churches where the pointed arch is used during this period, apparently adopted from Islamic architecture.

Vaults, doors, windows, stairs and chimney

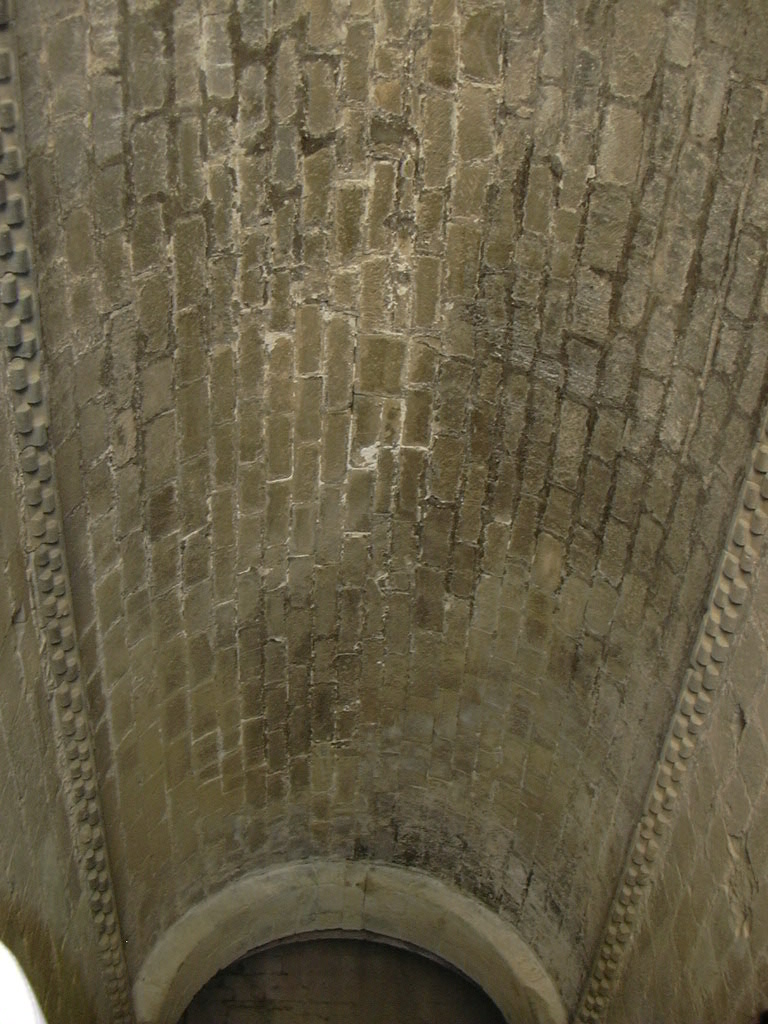
Barrel vault at Loarre Castle, Spain.

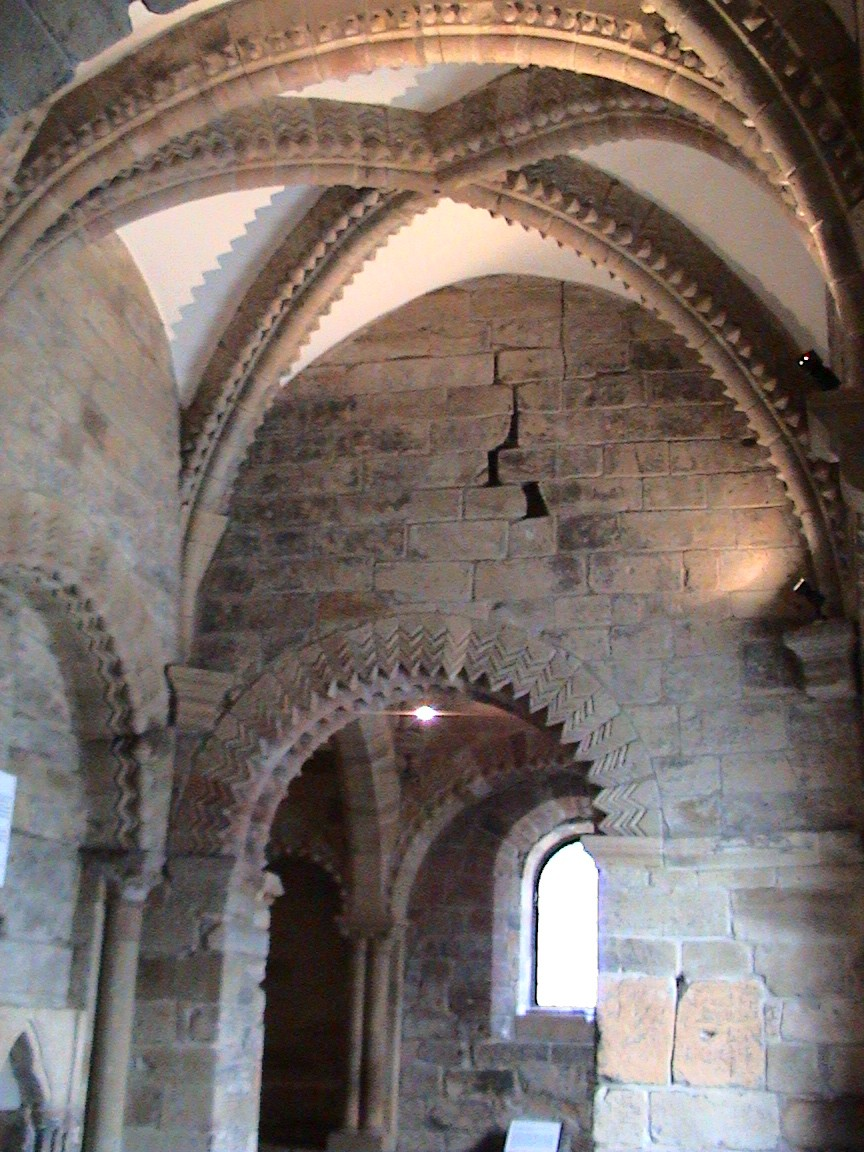
Ribbed vault at Newcastle Castle, England.

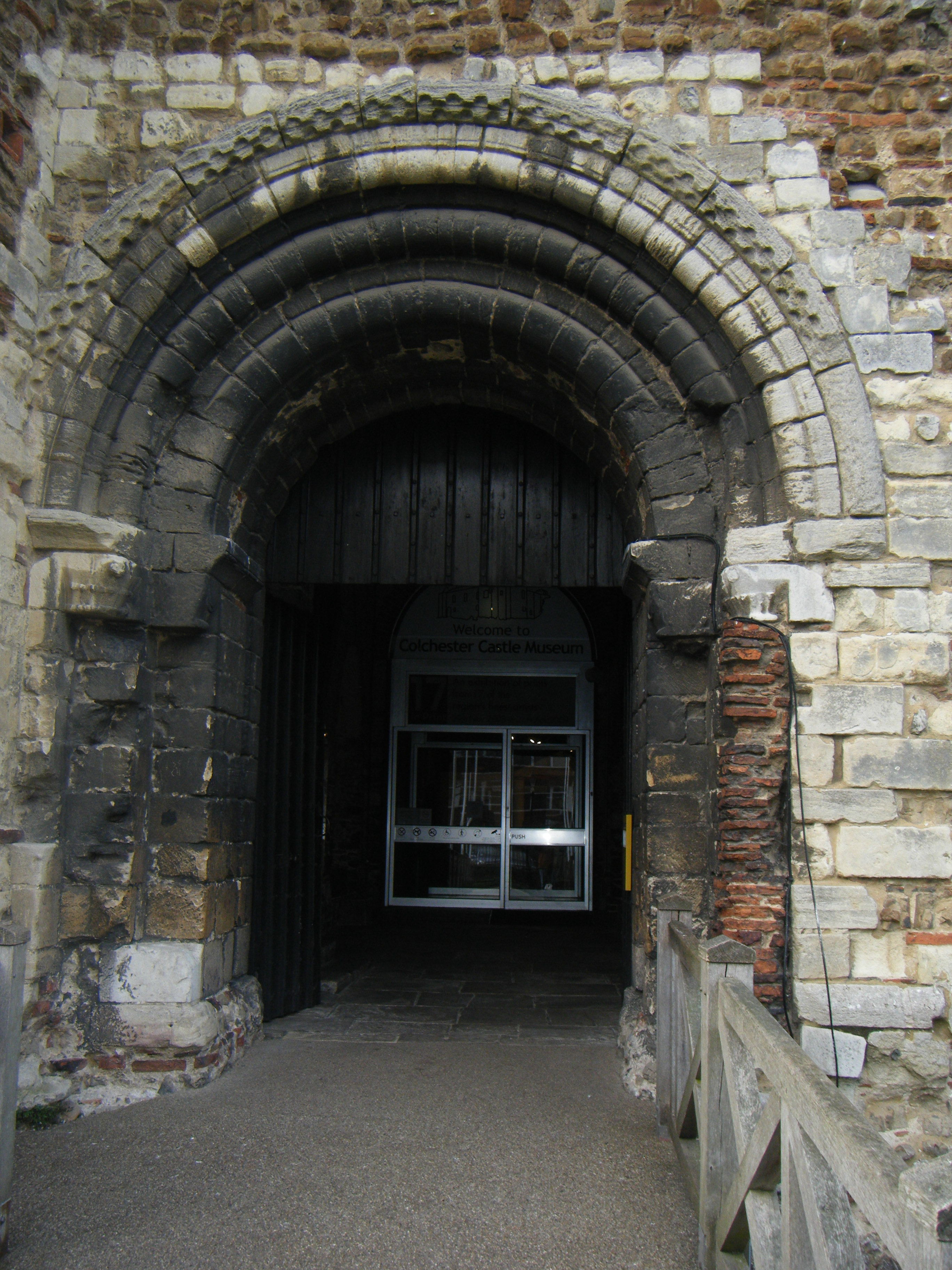
The portal of Colchester Castle, England.

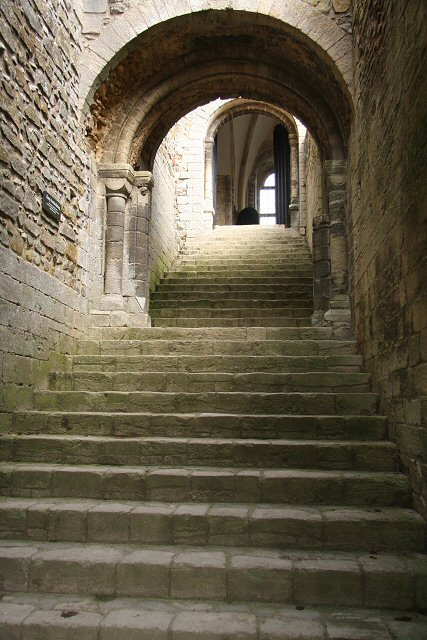
The stairs of Castle Rising keep, England.

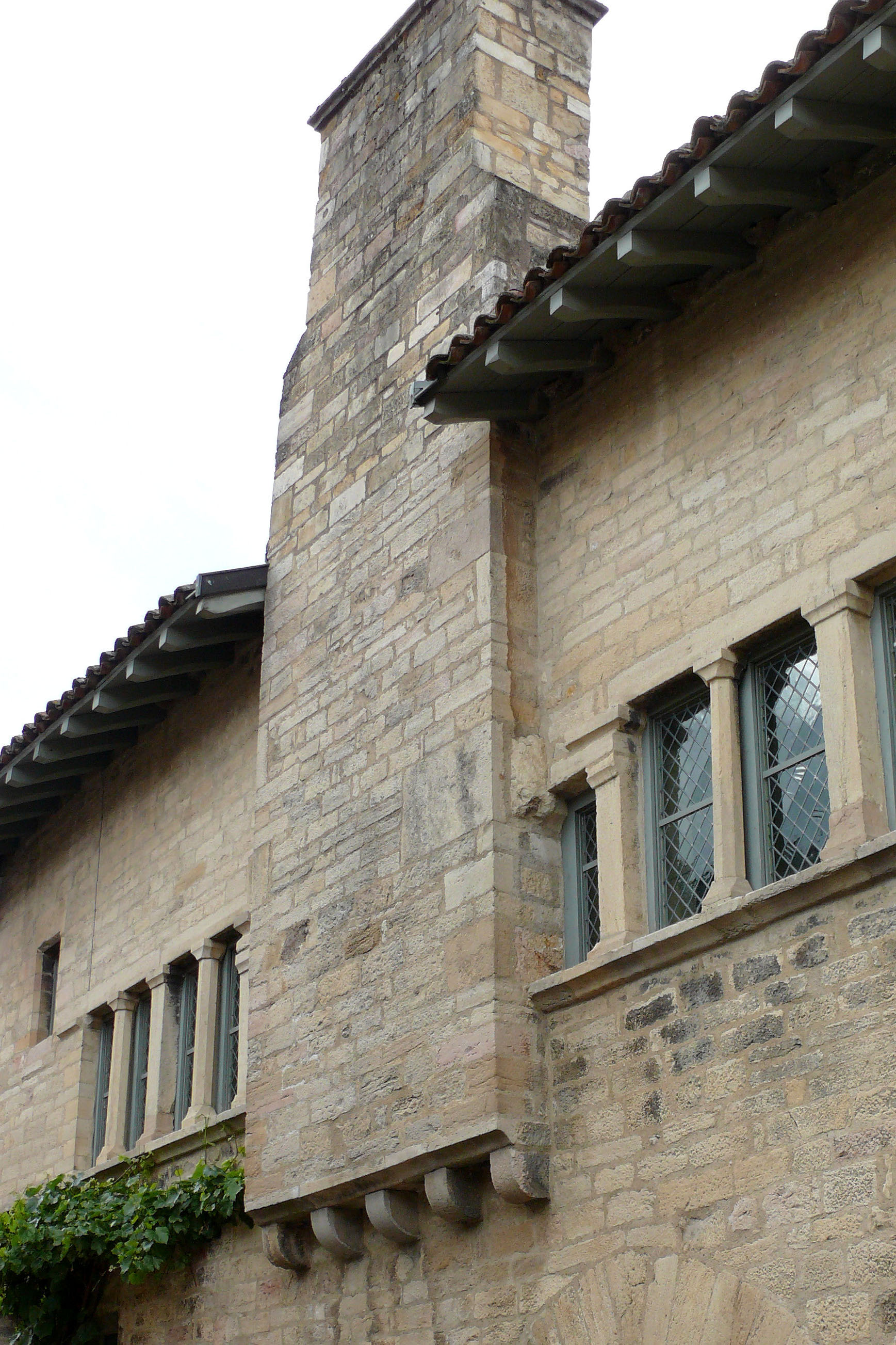
The chimney of Hôtel des Monnaies, Cluny, France
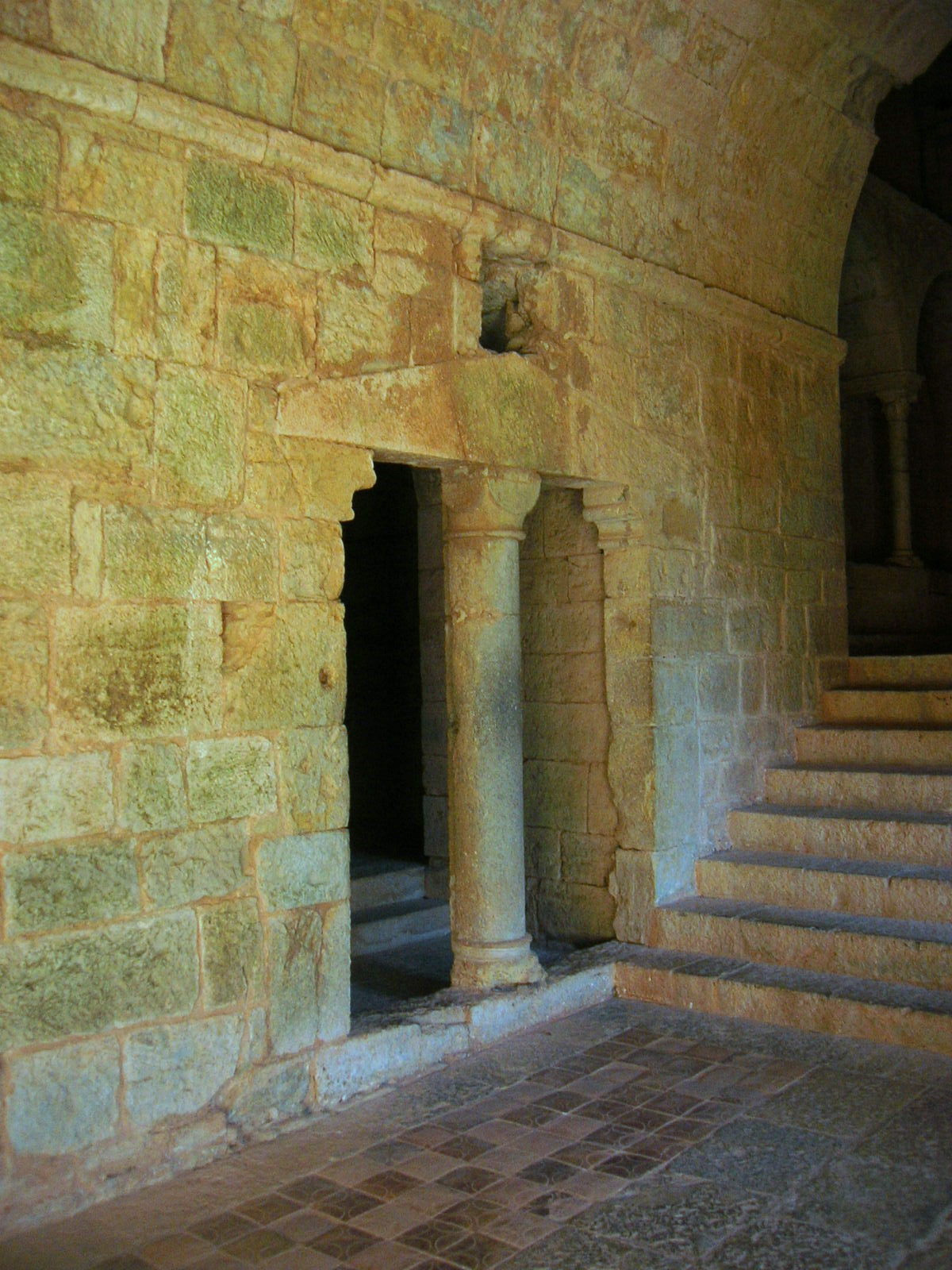
A door in the Abbey of Thoronet, France.

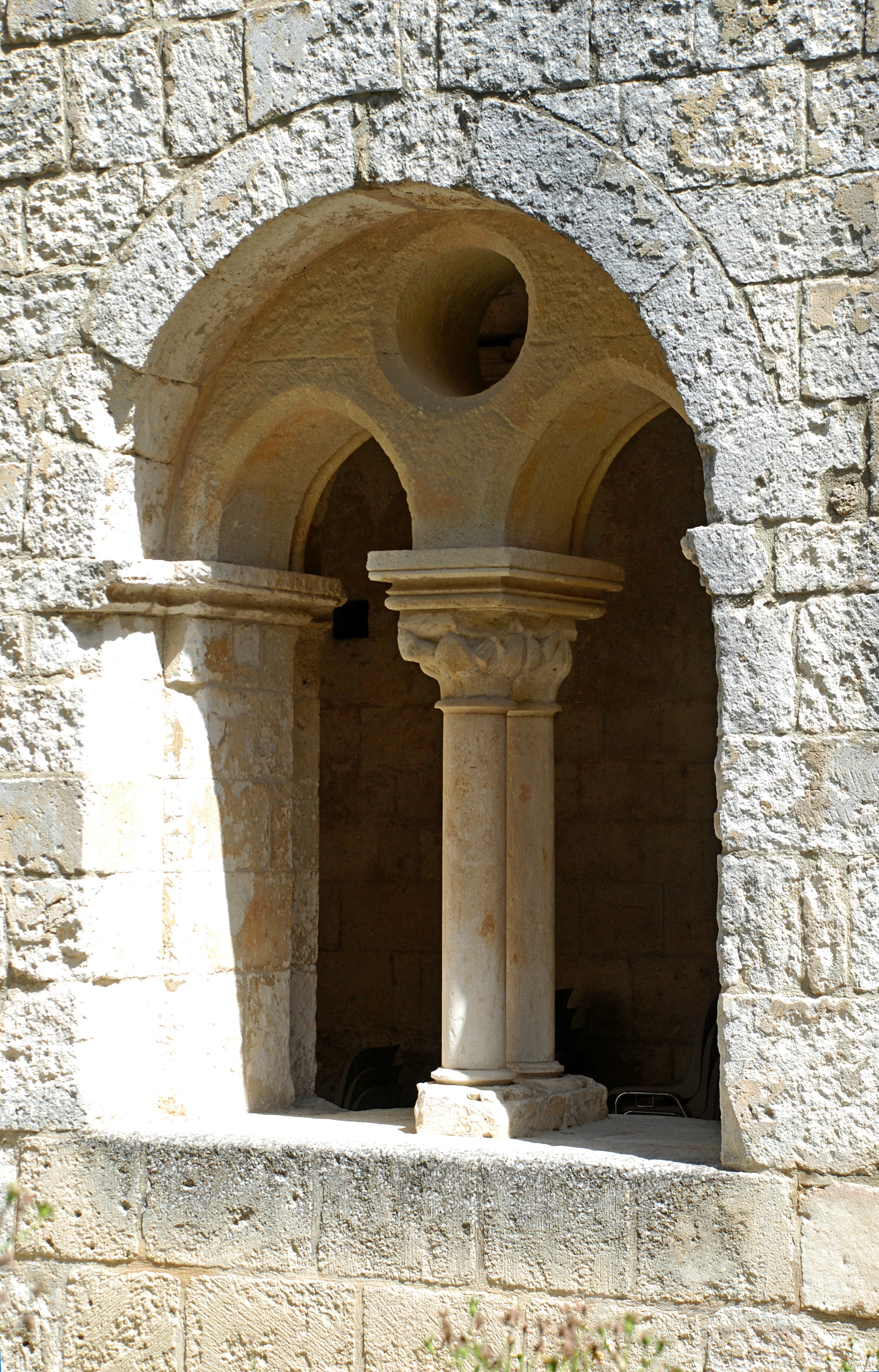
A cloister window at Silvacane Abbey, France.

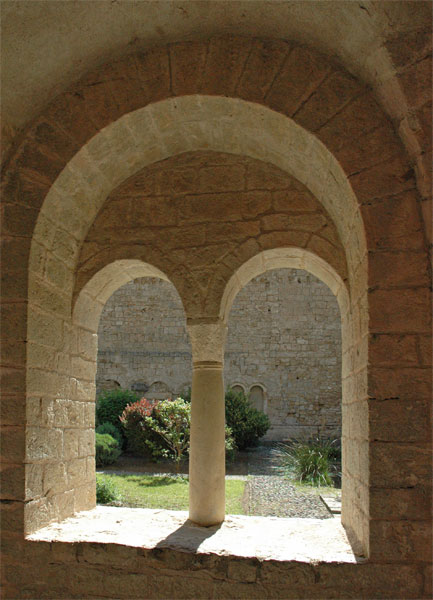
A window at Saint-Guilhem-le-Désert, France.

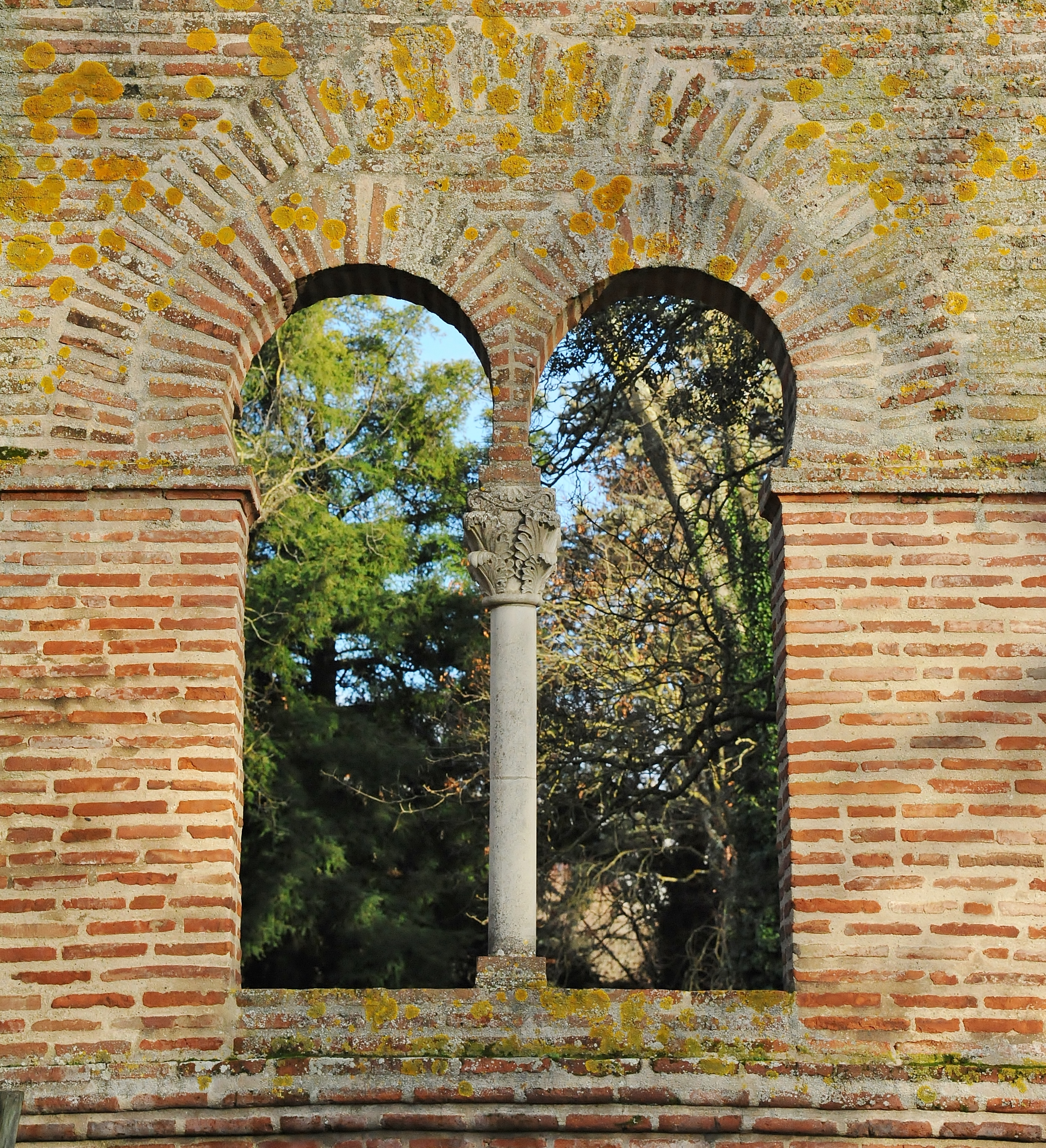
A brick window with carved capital in the Jardin des Plantes of Toulouse, France.

=== Architectural embellishment and sculpture ===
Stone buildings are often ornamented with projecting courses which may be flat fillets or rounded mouldings. These are sometimes carved with patterns, particularly chevrons. An arched doorway that is set into a thick wall may be deeply recessed, and have three or more bands of moulding around it. Doorways sometimes have colonnettes with small capitals, as are also found on the transoms that divide paired windows. Sometimes capitals and corbels are carved with floral motifs or figures.

Arcading is a significant decorative feature of Romanesque architecture, occurring most often in domestic architecture as a Lombard band which is a row of small arches that appear to support a roofline.

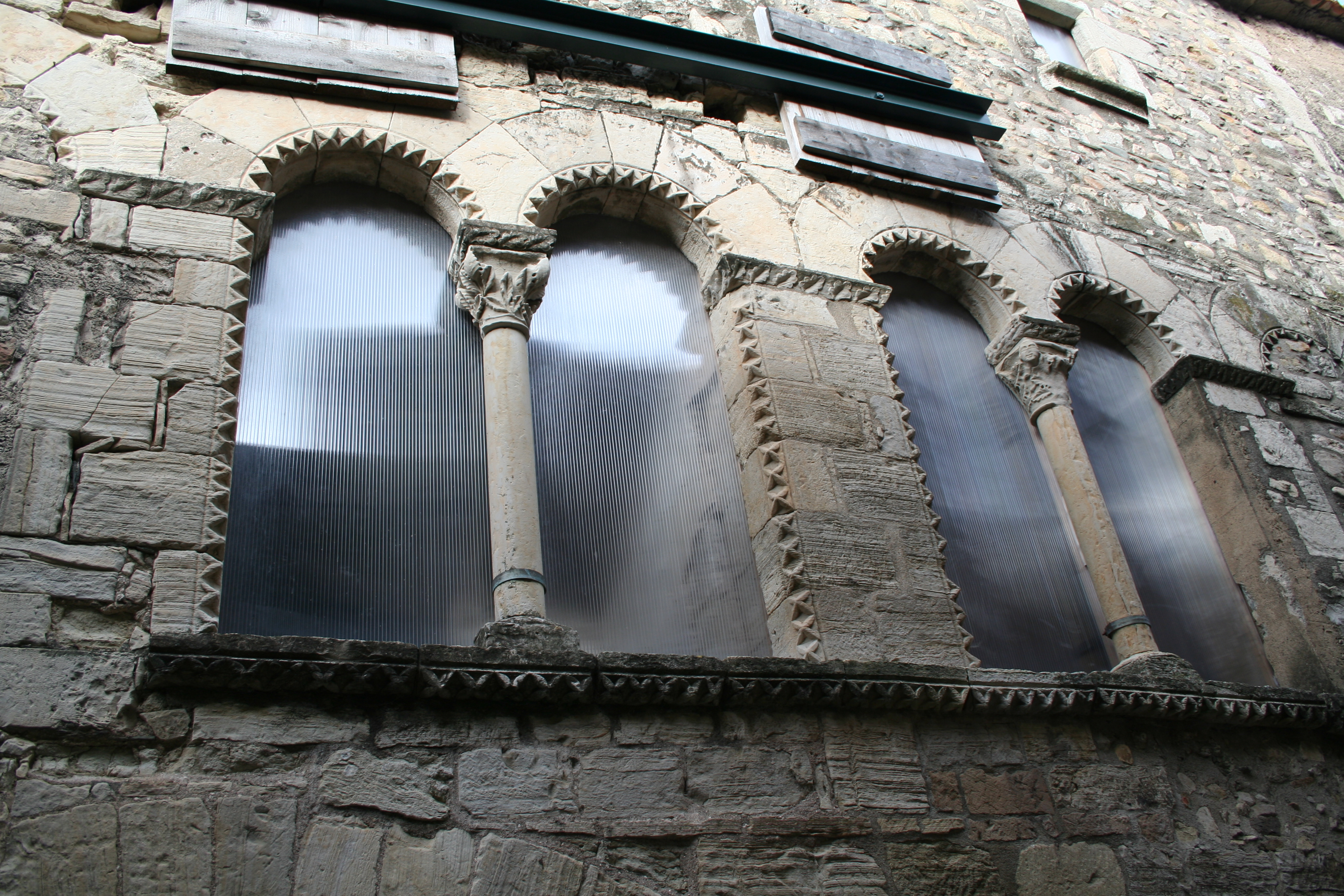
Details of the windows of a former mint in Villemagne l'Argentiere, France, showing chevroning and carved capitals.

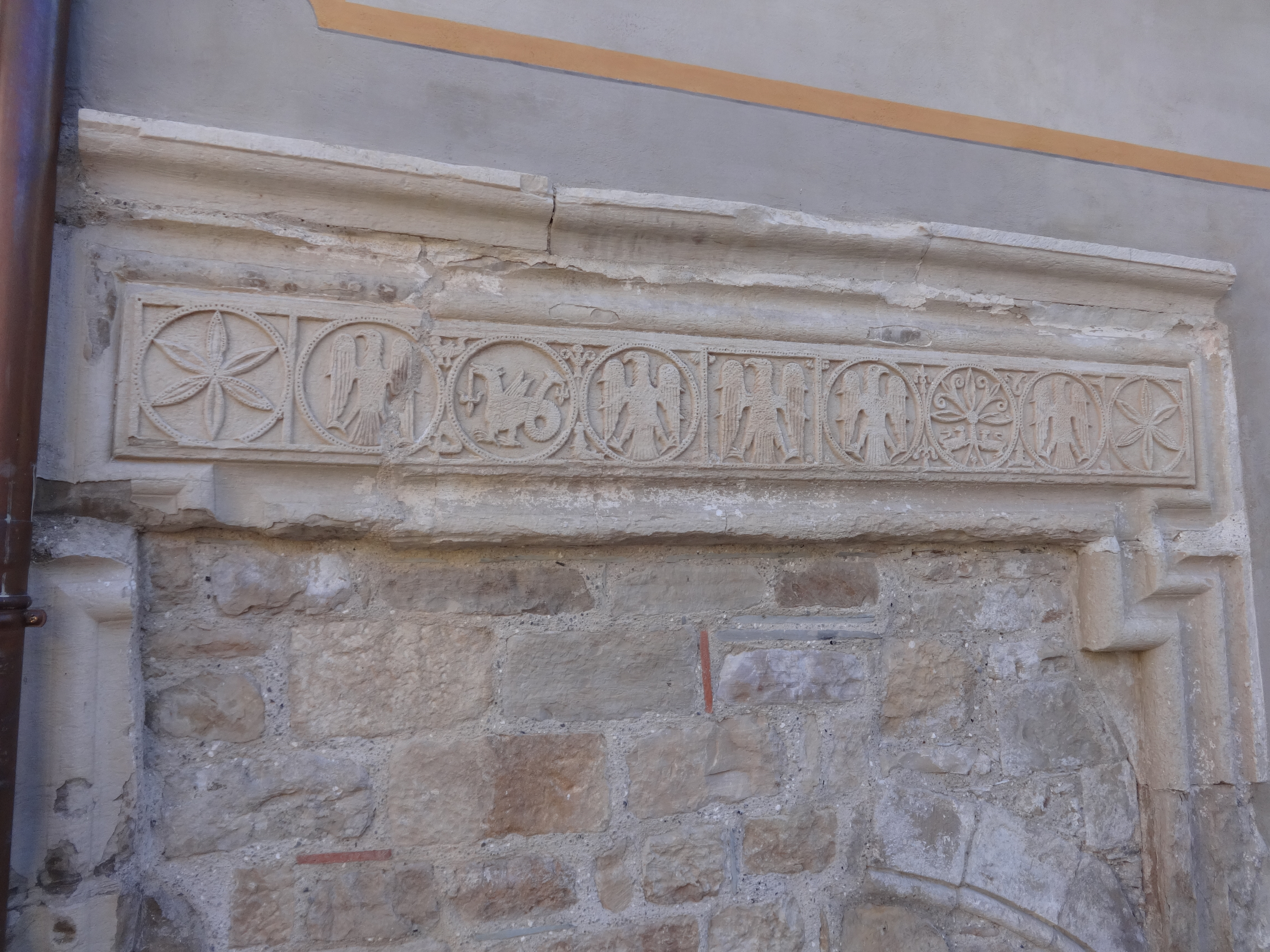
The delicately carved lintel of the same building

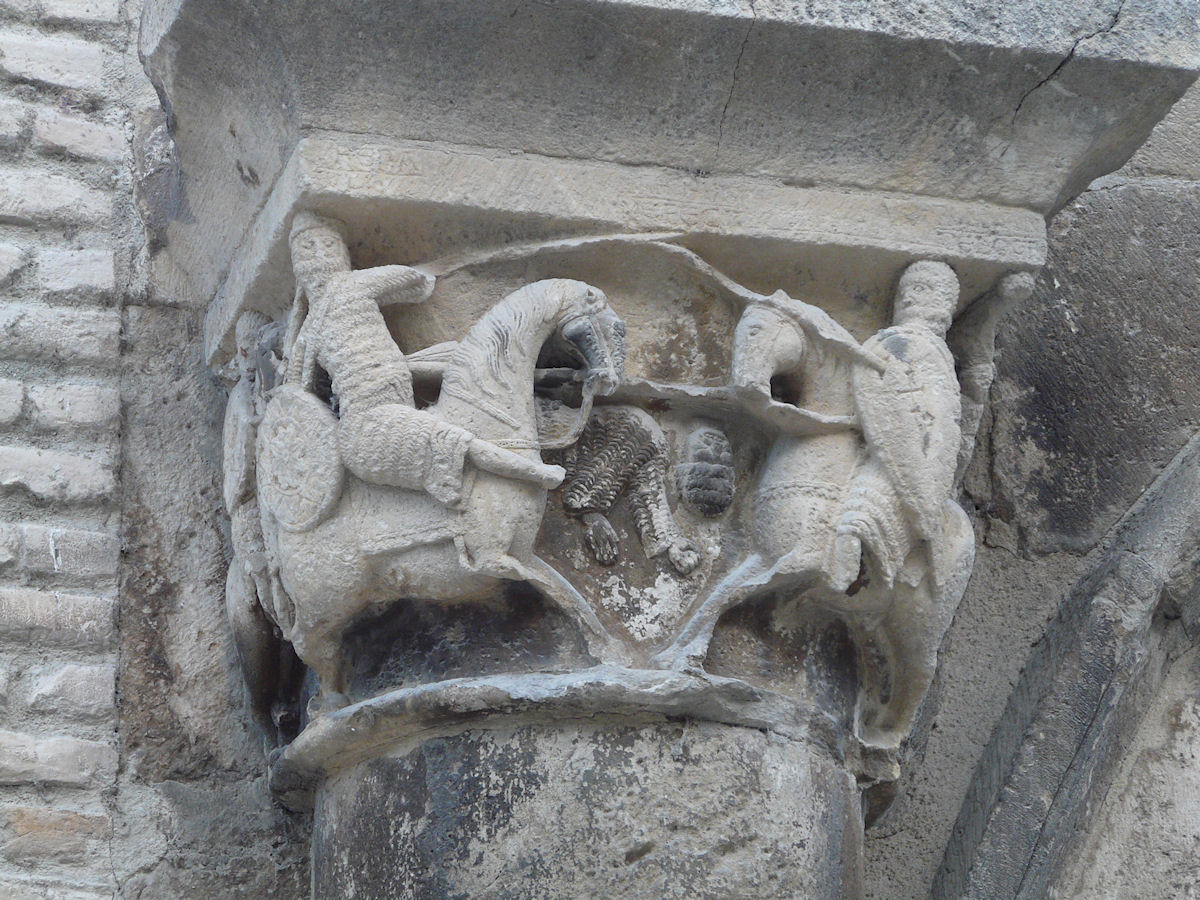
A capital depicting the fight of Roland and Ferragut on the Palacio de los Reyes de Navarra in Estella, Spain.

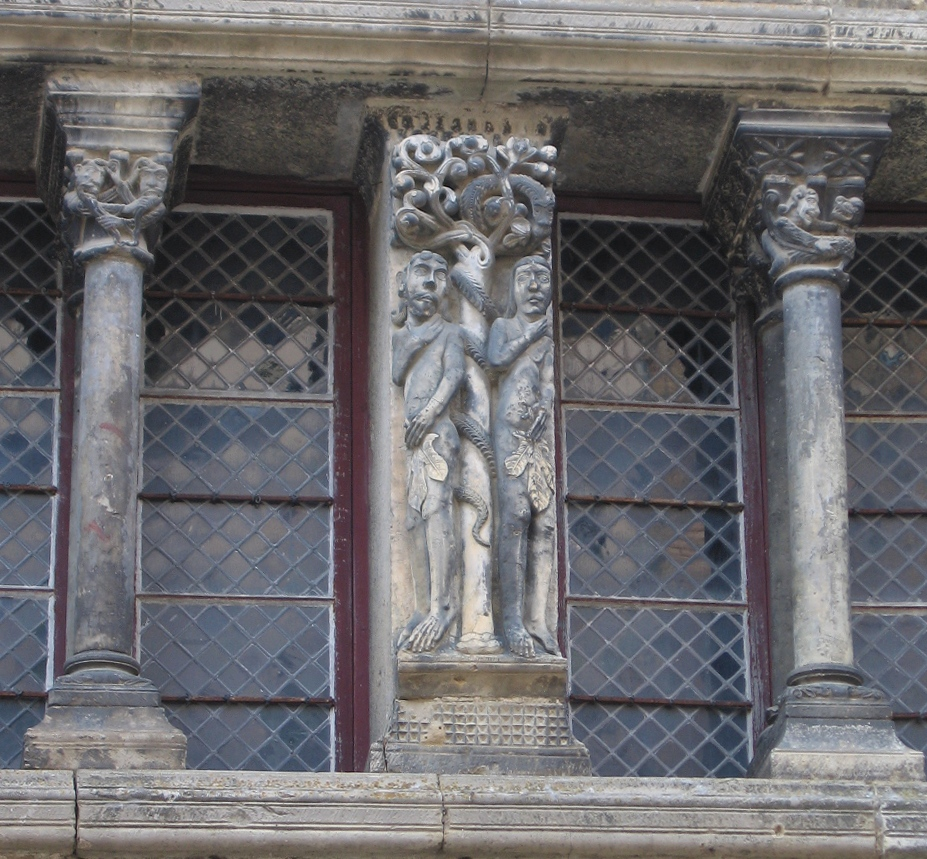
Carving of Adam and Eve on the mullion of a window at the House of the Vicomte of Saint-Antonin-Noble-Val, Tarn-et-Garonne.

=== Colour ===
Colour was used in a variety of ways to enhance buildings during this period. Rendered walls could be coloured, with different fashions prevailing in different regions. Stone buildings sometimes had external details picked out in colour. In Italy buildings were often constructed with alternating bands of brick and stone. In Venice, the palaces of wealthy families had veneers of marble which contrasted with the painted stucco. Internally, the large wall surfaces and plain, curving vaults of the Romanesque period lent themselves to mural decoration and traces of them have been found in castles and wealthy homes. However, the vast majority of these paintings, like the buildings themselves have been destroyed by rebuilding and redecoration, damp, war, neglect and changing fashion. The few exceptions of secular decoration have mostly survived because they were in the care of the church. Very rare survivals of high quality are the paintings from Arlanza in Spain, which are now dispersed to museums in Barcelona and America. These frescos of about 1210 come from a monastery, but have secular subject matter, and presumably are similar to those that existed in some palaces. There are a number of huge real and mythical animals reflecting the world of heraldry and illuminated bestiaries.

Tapestries and other textile hangings were also used to decorate palaces, with the Bayeux Tapestry much the best known example – though now in Bayeux Cathedral it was very probably originally made to decorate Bishop Odo's palace hall in the 1070s, and other such hangings are recorded. The narrative tale of a heroic victory in war was another theme no doubt often repeated. The 11th-century Cloth of St Gereon may always have been in a church, but its adoption of designs from figured Eastern textiles was also probably a style used in grand homes. Textile hangings helped to keep draughty stone buildings warm, and had the great advantage for those with many homes of being relatively easy to carry between them.

== Monastic buildings ==
Within the Catholic tradition, communal monasticism was established by Saint Benedict at Monte Cassino around 529. It was encouraged by Charlemagne with an increasing number of monasteries being founded across Europe in the late Middle Ages. The most influential orders during that period were the Benedictines, the Cluniacs founded at Cluny in 910, and then the Cistercians founded in 1098. Bernard of Clairvaux entered the Cistercian Order in 1113 and, as its leader, founded more than five hundred monasteries of austere design and often in remote locations.

The Carolingian Plan of Saint Gall dating from the early 9th century is a detailed draught of an abbey church and its accompanying monastic buildings, the oldest such architectural plan to exist since Roman times. It shows an idealised arrangement with individual cells for monks, workshops, amenities, gardens, stables and a school. It constitutes a living space for a completely self-sufficient community. Natural constraints such as the building site, the close proximity of town buildings, and lack of funds meant that in practice few monasteries were so lavishly constructed during the Romanesque period. From the 10th century, the great Abbey of Cluny set a standard of building and amenities that was to be emulated by others.

The surviving domestic and utility buildings of monastic complexes are in general set apart from the surviving dwellings of the common laity by the quality of both structure and detail. Although built for the communal living of lives vowed to poverty and simplicity, monastic buildings are in general solidly constructed and finely finished with vaulted ceilings, mouldings, columns and carvings that are directly related to the forms found in monastic churches, while the cloisters that formed the nucleus of monastic life are frequently masterpieces of Romanesque construction, style and ornament.

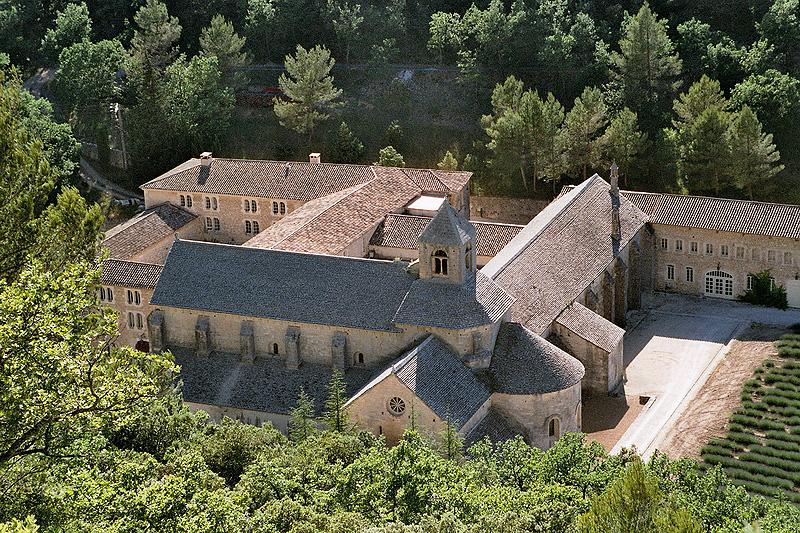
The Romanesque Sénanque Abbey church and surrounding monastic buildings, Gordes, France.

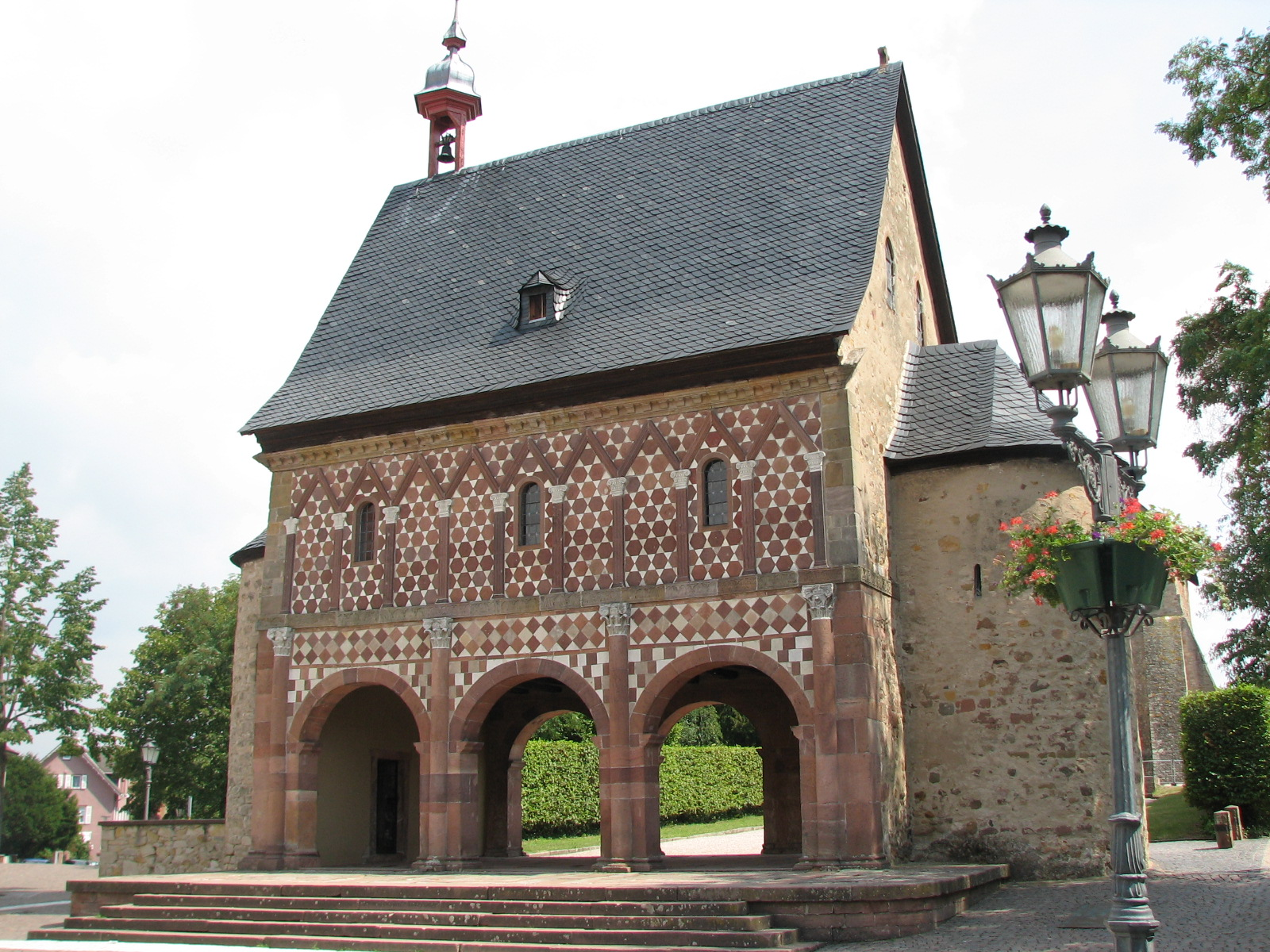
The Carolingian gatehouse of Lorsch Abbey, Germany.

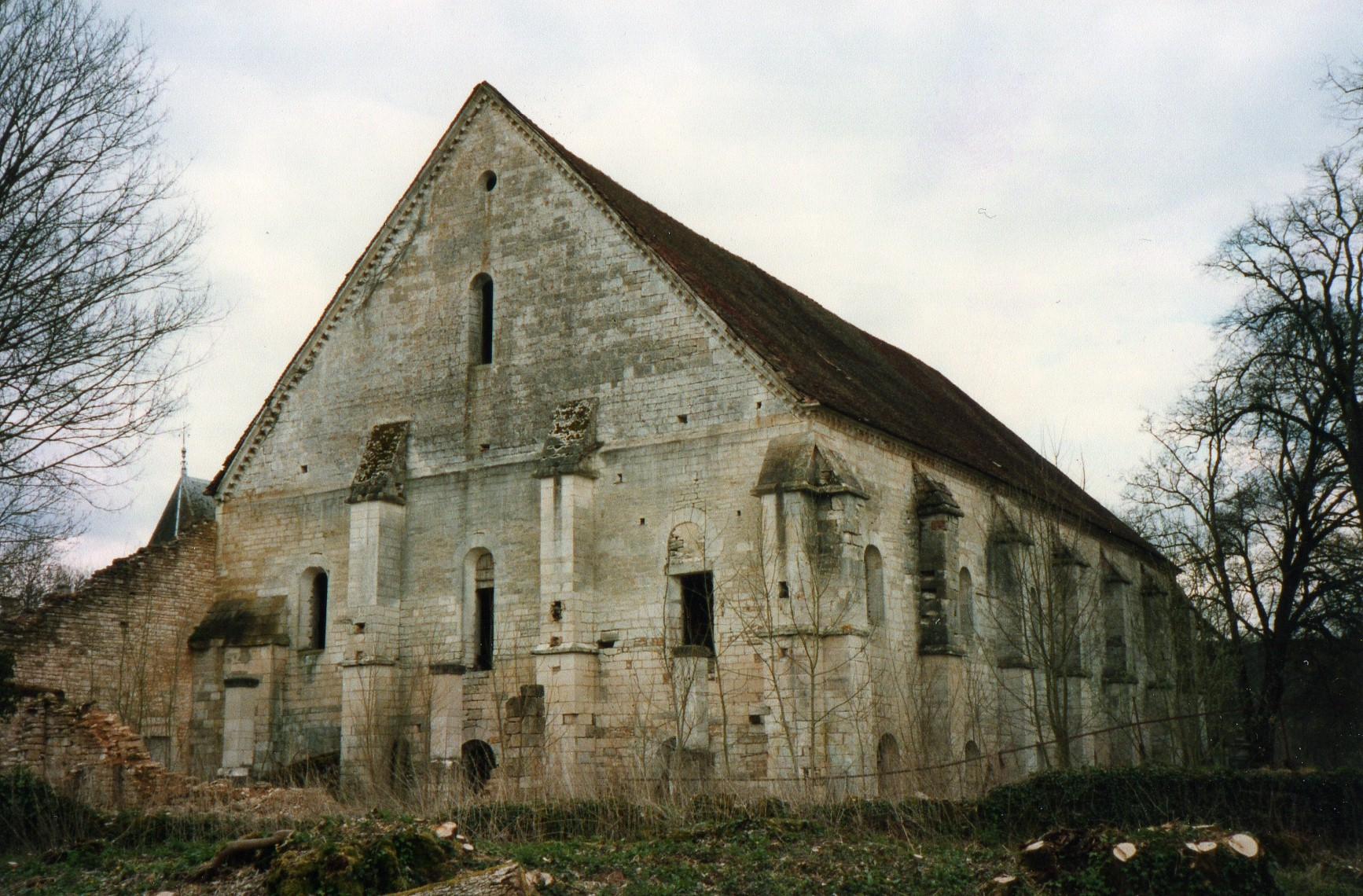
The Lay Brothers' Hall, Longuay Abbey, Aubepierre-sur-Aube, France.

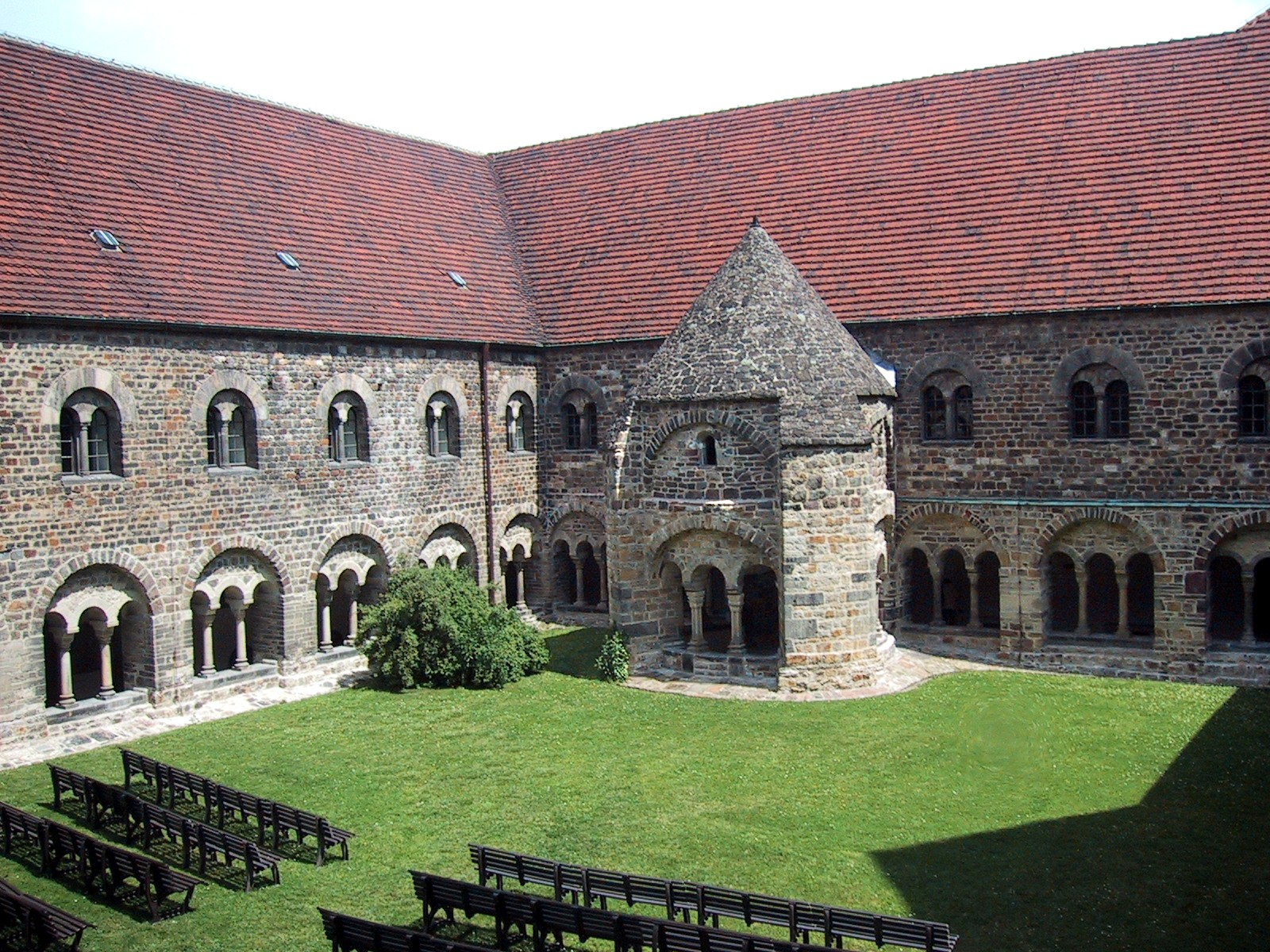
Cloister and well-house of the monastery Unser Lieben Frauen, Magdeburg, Germany.

=== Types of buildings ===
In general, the main living and working quarters of any monastery were the cloisters, four arcaded passages that surrounded a courtyard and were located, wherever possible, adjacent to and on the southern (sunniest) side of the church. The arcades at ground level were the monk's working and general living space, containing carrels for study and writing, and often along one range, a "lavatorium" where the monks could wash their hands and faces before eating. Above the arcades ran long dormitories where the monks slept. Where such buildings still exist from the Romanesque period, they are built of stone, although at the majority of early monasteries, they were probably of wooden construction. Monastic buildings generally became increasingly comfortable and more robust over time, with stone replacing wood, open arcades being glazed against the wind and open dormitories being fitted with wooden screens for warmth and privacy.

A number of buildings surrounded and abutted the cloister. The chapter house was the most significant, as the meeting place of the governing body of the abbey. It generally projected from the eastern side of the cloister, and might have near it a narrow passage or "slype" that led to a burial ground near the eastern end of the church.

Also off the cloister arcade was a calefactory or "warming room" where a fire burnt during the winter. It was generally located under part of the dormitory. A staircase often descended from the dormitory directly into a transept of the church, and was used by the monks at night. Projecting from the dormitory was the "necessarium" or toilet block, with a drain running beneath the toilets. An important building of which a number of examples have survived was the refectory or dining hall. Adjacent to the refectory were the monastic kitchens, with their proximity to the cloister being determined by whether the cooking was done by the brethren of the monastery or by lay employees.

Set apart from the cloister was the infirmary for the treatment of the sick, and where elderly frail members of the monastic community could be cared for. This was generally a large hall but might constitute a whole separate complex with its own chapel, kitchen and courtyard. A separate dining chamber known as the "misericord" was often attached to the infirmary, so that sick and infirm aged brothers could benefit by eating red meat, something not permitted in the refectory.

Early in the establishment of monasteries, it was expected that the abbot or prior would live in the dormitory, in communion with the other monks. As the role of abbot became increasingly that of a business manager and entrepreneur, this humble living style was abandoned, and separate houses were built, outside the cloister. Other buildings commonly occurring within monastic precinct include bakehouses, breweries, granaries, well houses, forges, barns and dovecotes. Guest houses were often built for travellers, and alms houses for the care of the poor. Schools were also found in association with monasteries. Many monasteries had a gatehouse where a member of the laity lived and guarded the monastic precinct.

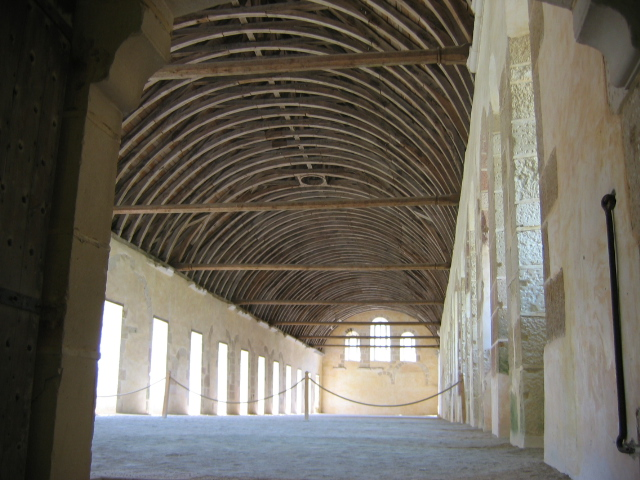
The dormitory at Fontenay Abbey, France. Present roof, early 1500s.

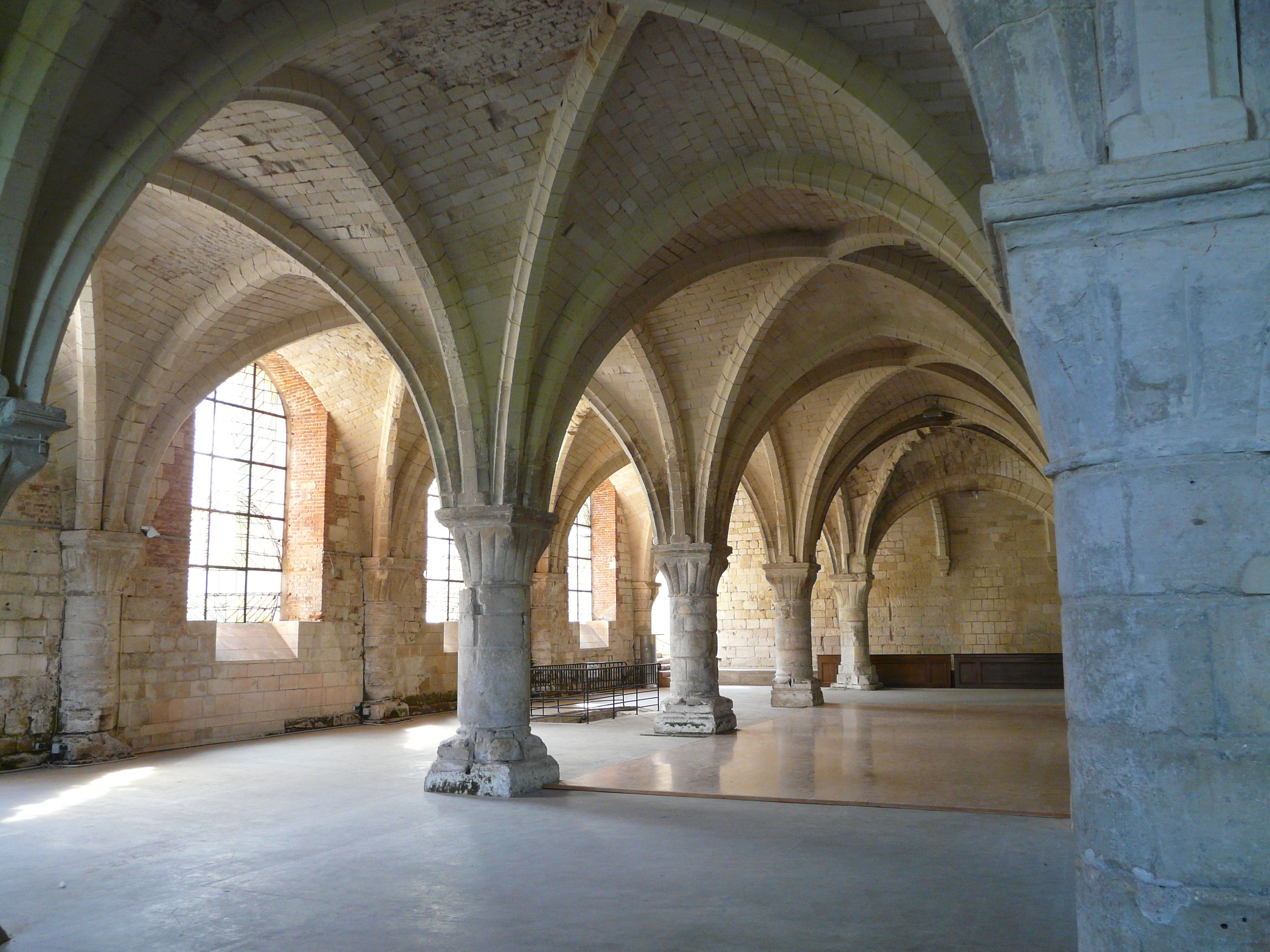
The Monk's Hall, Vaucelles Abbey, Les Rues-des-Vignes, France.

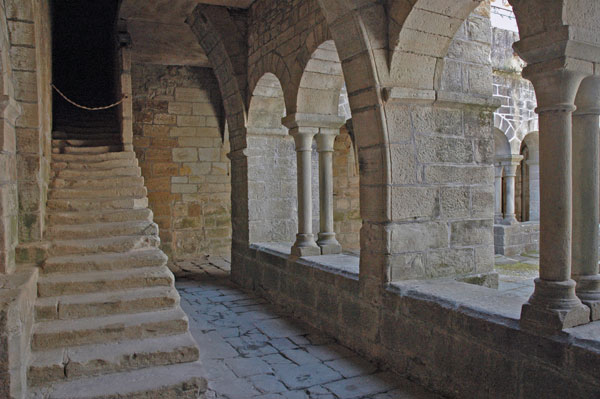
The monks' stairs at Saint-Michel de Grandmont Priory, Saint-Privat, France.

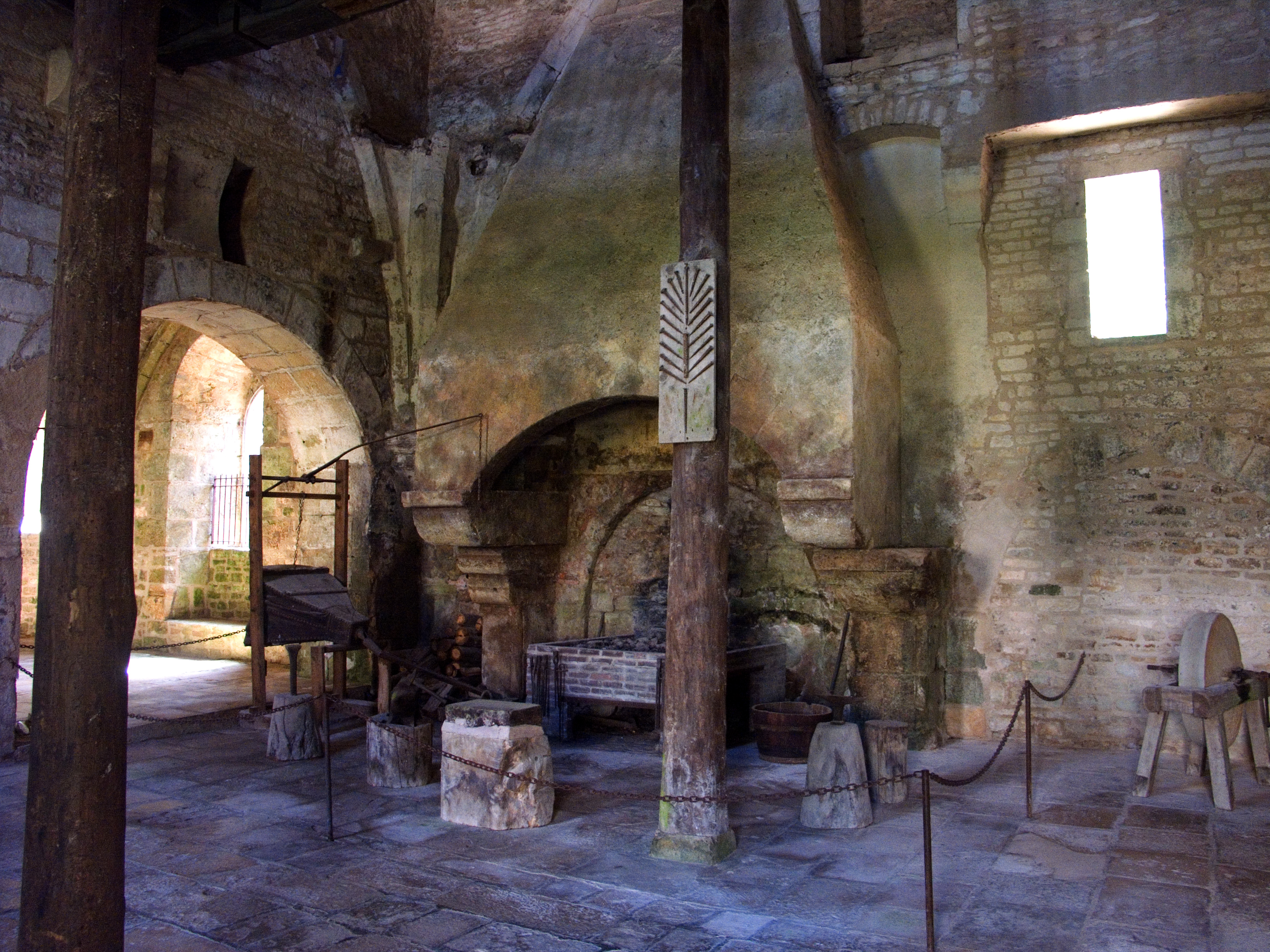
The forge at Fontenay Abbey, France.

=== Examples ===
Monastic complexes often developed over several centuries, with buildings of different dates abutting each other, and individual buildings being enlarged and altered in later architectural periods. Apart from churches (which are dealt with in a separate article), large Romanesque buildings are rare, even within the context of ancient monasteries. However, a number of fine examples exist, scattered across Europe, with Sénanque Abbey, consecrated in 1178, being a rare survival that has retained many of its original Romanesque buildings intact, including the church, cloister, dormitory, calefactory and chapter house. The monastery of St Martin-du-Canigou, founded 1005, has also retained its original form and some of its original domestic buildings, although damaged, both by earthquake and over-zealous restoration. At Maulbronn in Germany the medieval monastery has remained virtually intact, but typically the buildings vary in date, with the earliest being Romanesque of the late 12th century. The Abbey of Fontenay has retained a number of important buildings including the monks' dormitory, the monks' hall, the scriptorium and a large forge.

At Lorsch in Germany and at Bury St Edmunds in England remain two impressive gatehouses of very different styles. The Lorsch Abbey gatehouse led into a complex the form of which can now only be determined by archaeology. The gatehouse itself dates from 774 and combines a number of features from Classical Antiquity such as Corinthian columns and the triumphal arch motif with Northern European vernacular in the triangulation of the "arches" of the upper story and the steeply pitched roof, and Byzantine ornament in the polychrome surface decoration. The Norman Tower at Bury St Edmunds was built by Abbott Anselm in the second quarter of the 11th century as the main entrance to the monastery from the town. It rises in four stages of different heights, with a single arched portal and groups of three openings of varied design on the upper levels, between flattened corner buttresses.

Romanesque cloisters remain at many ancient monasteries, particularly in France, Spain and Italy. They vary from simple structures with wooden trussed roofs or groin vaults and arcades supported on stout piers as at St Michael's, Hildesheim, to elegant ribbed-vaults and arcades filled with plate tracery like those at the Cathedral of Tarragona, Spain, and supported on highly decorated paired columns with figurative capitals like those at St Pierre, Moissac, France and St John Laterano, Rome. The cloisters sometimes retain an upper arcade which gave access to dormitories or cells, as at the Cathedral St. Léonce and the monastery of Santo Domingo de Silos in Burgos.

Of the various chambers that abutted the cloisters, those on the ground floor often had groin or ribbed vaults like those found in the scriptorium at Fontenay. Where large buildings such as the forge at Fontenay have survived, they take the form of barn-like halls with flattened buttresses and small round-headed windows.

Cloisters often contained a well. At Unser Lieben Frauen in Magdeburg, Germany, there is an elaborate well-house in the cloister, while a ruined example exists at Mellifont Abbey.

Monastic cloisters

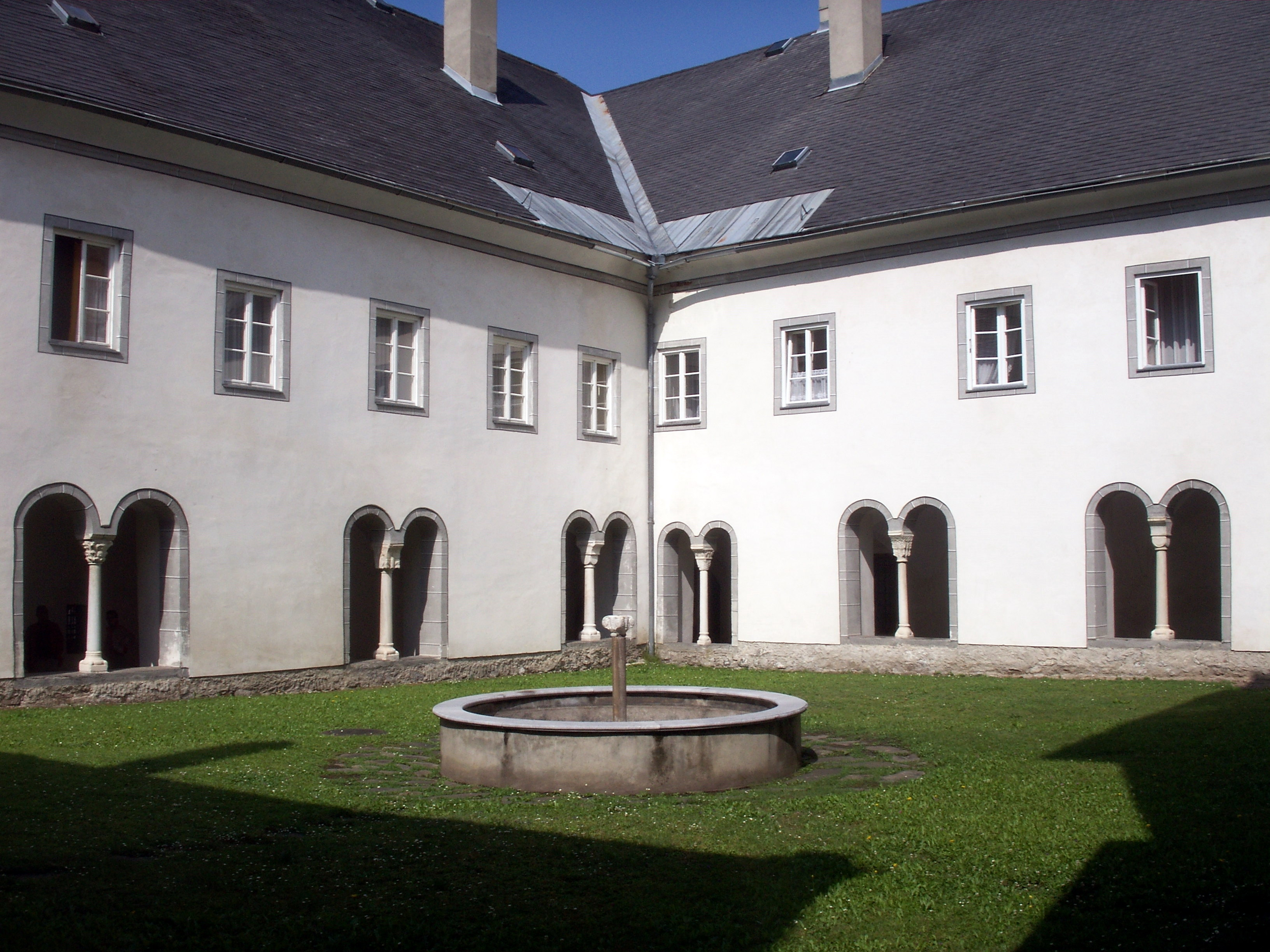
The cloisters at Millstatt Abbey, Austria have alternating piers and openings.

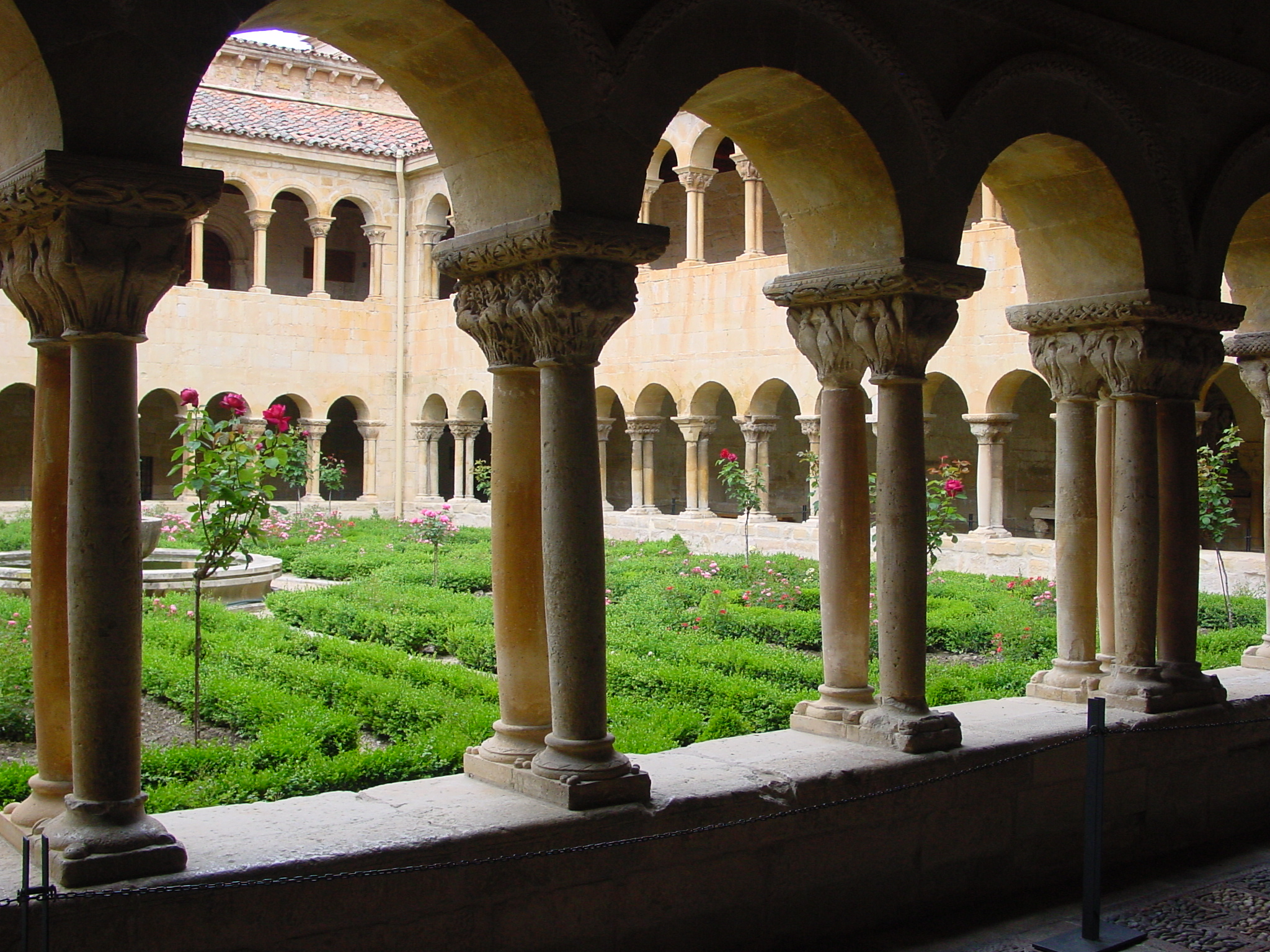
The Abbey of Santo Domingo de Silos, Spain, has an upper arcade for access.

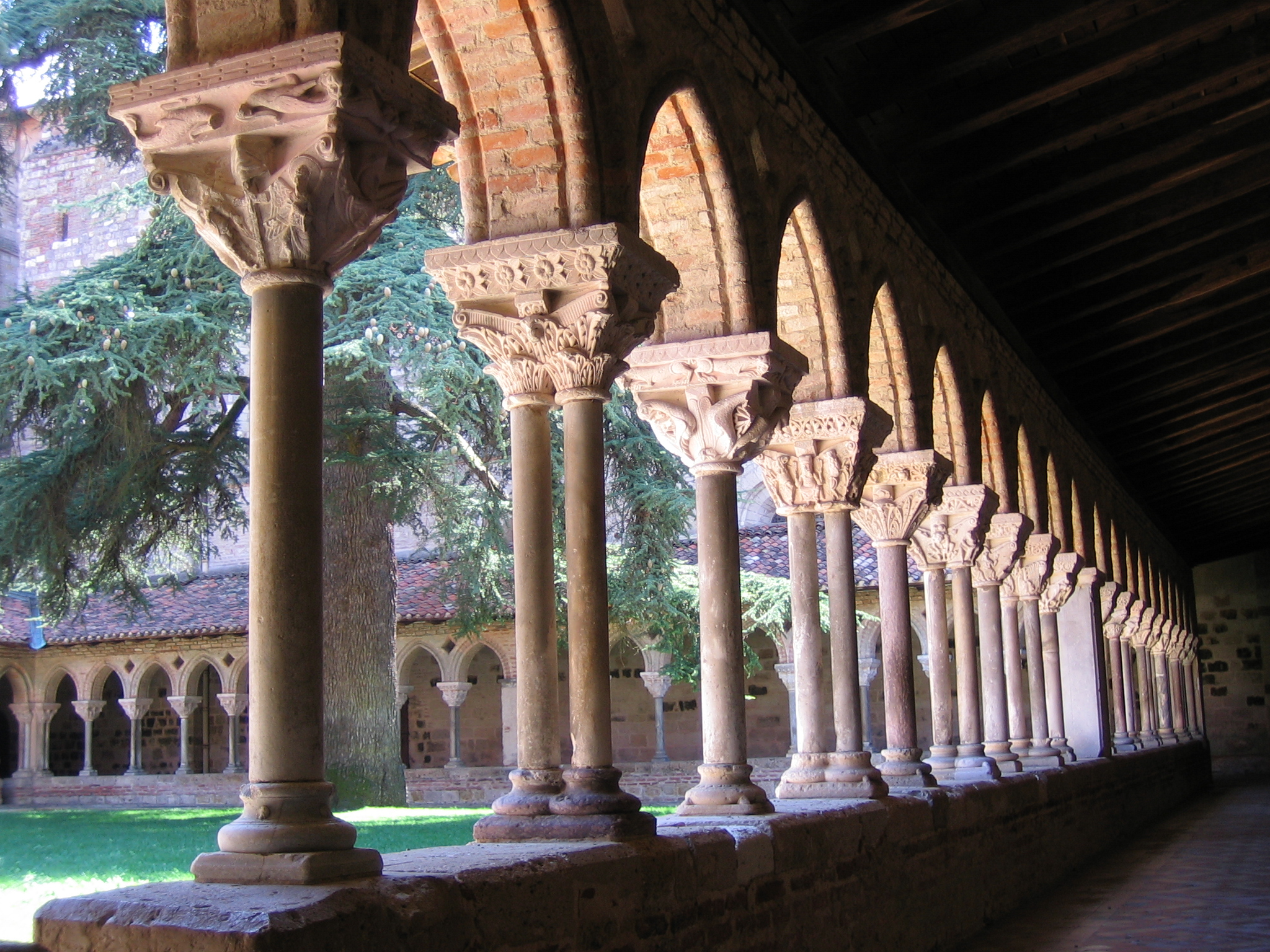
The cloisters at the St Pierre Abbey, Moissac, France are renowned for their carved capitals.

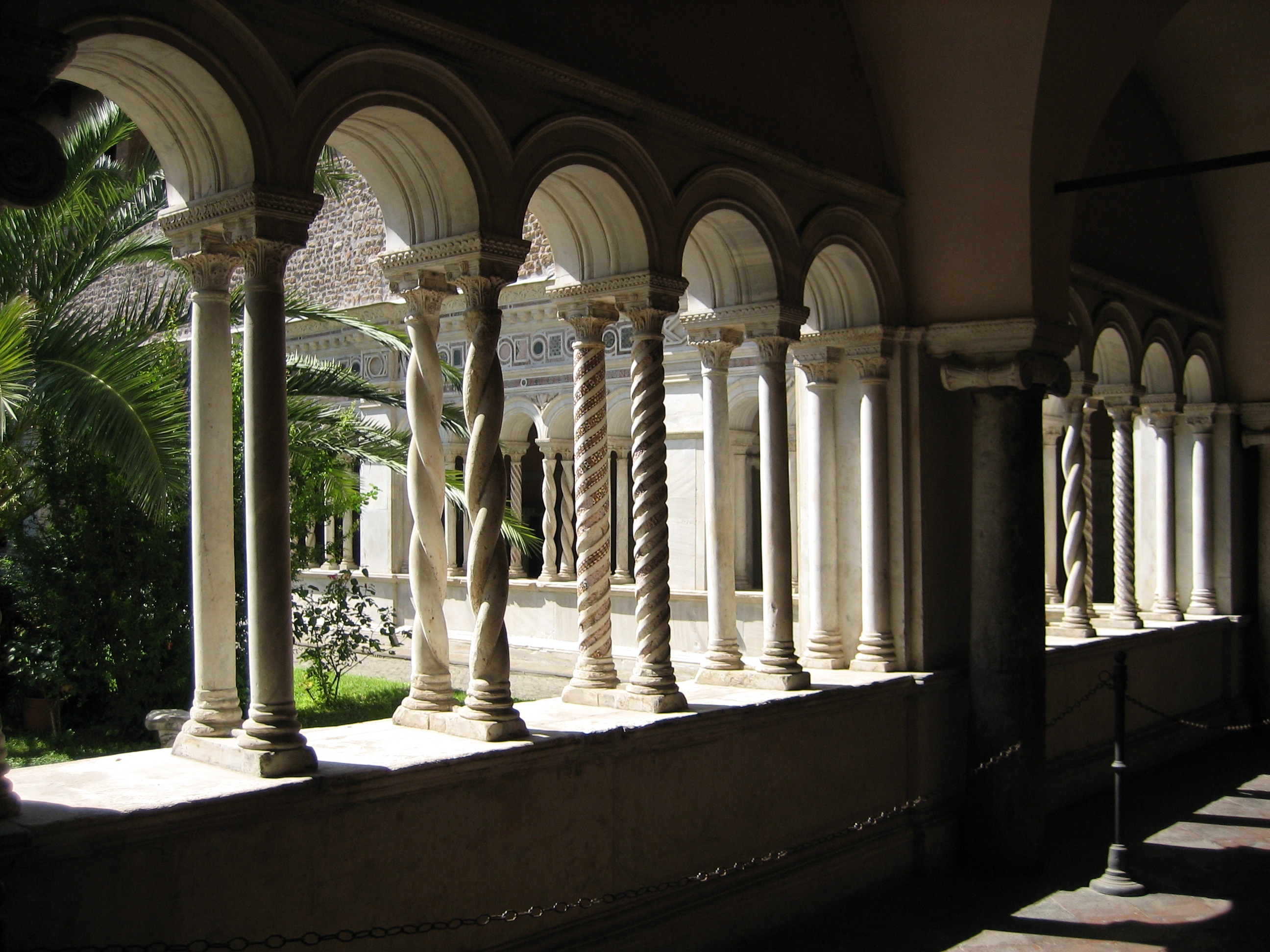
Cosmatesque style in action: twisted columns and mosaics at the cloister in San Giovanni in Laterano, Rome.

== Fortified buildings ==
The castle represents, overwhelmingly, the type of domestic architecture for which there is the greatest number of surviving examples in the Romanesque style. There also exist a range of domestic buildings associated with monastic precincts, palaces, civic buildings and town houses.

=== Keeps ===
Castles developed from wooden palisades, built for defense, or from mottes where an earth mound, usually artificial, was surmounted by a tall wooden structure and often surrounded by ditches. This latter system of defense was further developed with the addition of outer palisades enclosing a bailey in which domestic buildings were constructed. From about 1000 onwards the wooden building on the motte was replaced with a donjon (stone keep), the earliest of which is believed to have been at Doue-la-Fontaine, Maine-et-Loire, France, built in about 950.

Judging from the size of the openings to be found in the lower stories, the earliest tall stone buildings appear to have served chiefly as residences. However, with necessity, they developed an increasing number of defensive features. Many such castles were to be erected by the Norman invaders of England. Although a number of 12th-century keeps such as those of Houdan and Provins castles in France were circular or polygonal in plan, square keeps predominated in England. Examples of square keeps include the White Tower (the Tower of London), Castle Hedingham in Essex and Rochester Castle in Kent. After 1150, there were a greater number of polygonal keeps, which were harder to mine. Examples include those at Windsor Castle, Conisborough and Orford castles.

These castles of rectangular plan are hall-keeps, with their primary purpose being as the dwelling of a ruler, the hall being the main living chamber, generally on the first floor. In some such keeps the basement level has columns supporting a vault. The floors above this are of wood, supported on long timber beams of which plenty could be cut from the forests at that date. Within a large keep like that at Rochester, the main spaces could be divided by a stone wall or tier of arcades rising through several storeys. Many castles had projecting turrets at the corners which contained spiral staircases, while the thick walls of the upper storeys contained passages. Rochester has retained a fireplace set into a wall within a decorated arch. Upper floors of Romanesque keeps sometimes have differentiated windows marking the private rooms of the lord and lady. There may also be a chapel; for example, located in the White Tower of the Tower of London is the St John's Chapel, set in a corner turret.

In mountainous regions, castles often take highly irregular forms, adapting the plan to the site in varied ways. Castles have often developed over the centuries and typically have had additional encircling walls added. Between 1072 and 1080, Sancho III of Navarre (the Great) built Loarre Castle on a high rocky ridge in the foothills of the Pyrenees, as a commitment to the Reconquista. The castle was further fortified in the 13th century by an outer wall with ten towers. Although outwardly of austere appearance, Castle Loarre has living quarters of comparative comfort, and a chapel ornamented with fine carvings.

Development of the castle keep

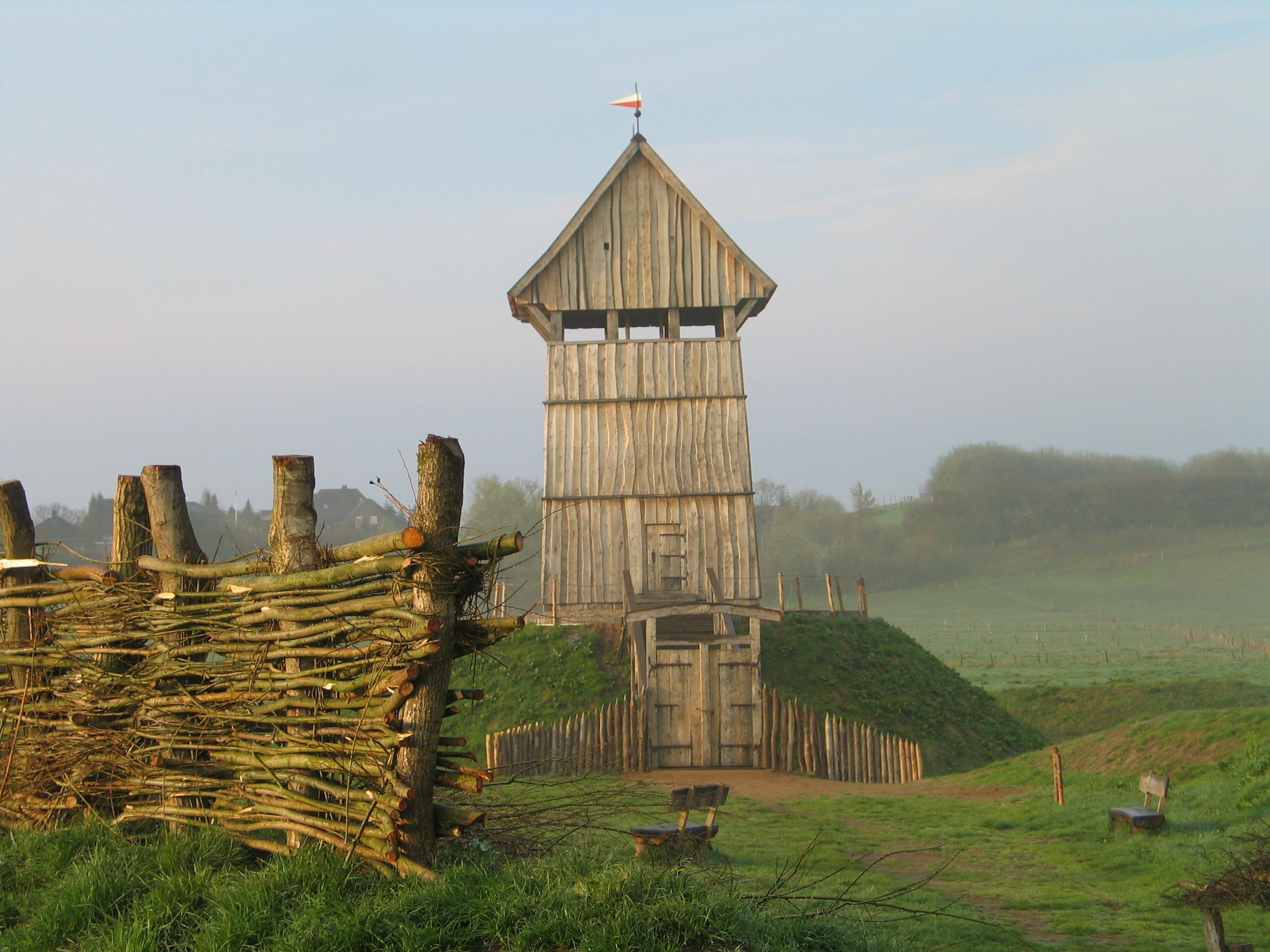
A reconstructed motte and tower at Lütjenburg, Germany.

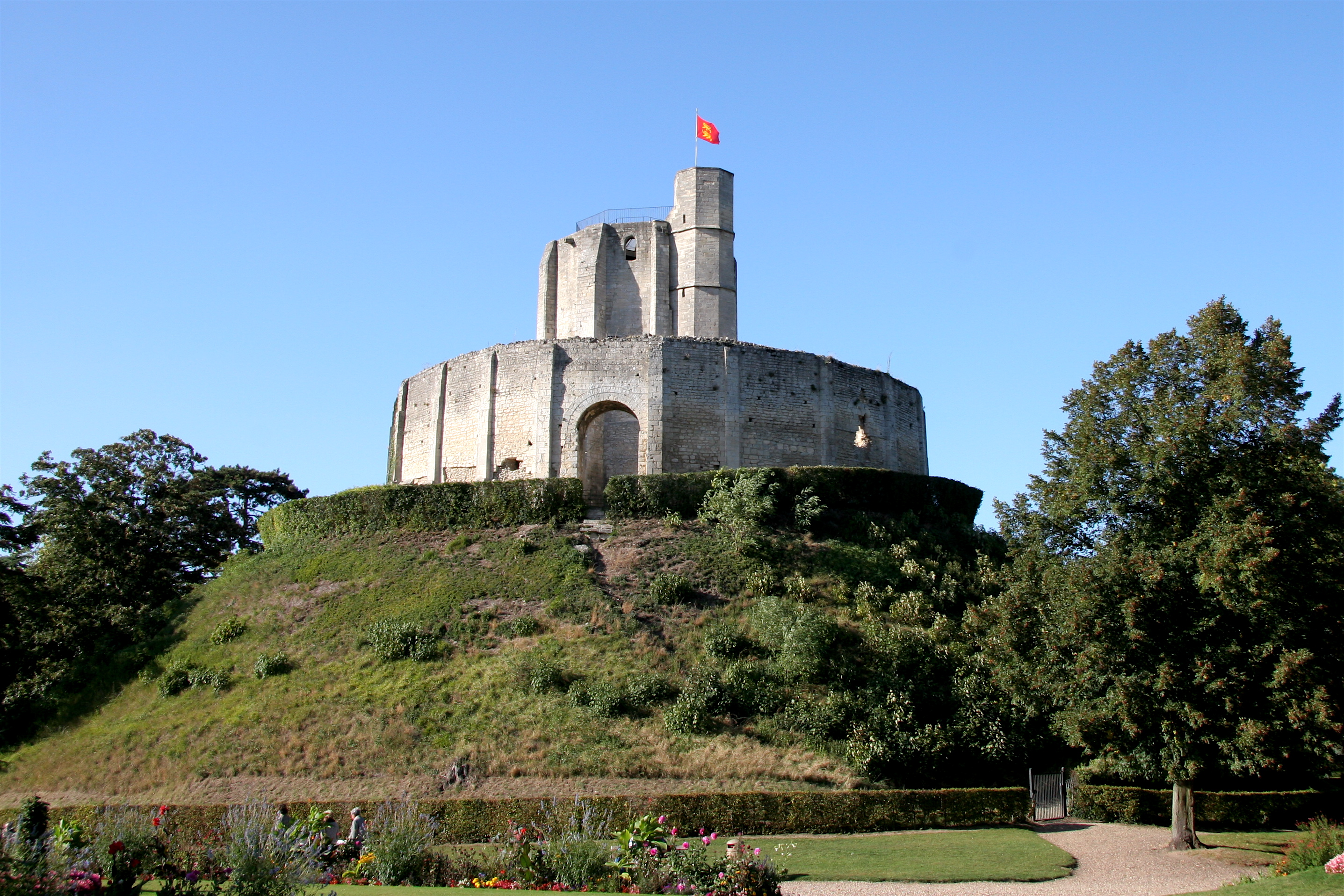
The polygonal donjon at Gisors, France, on a motte with an encircling wall.

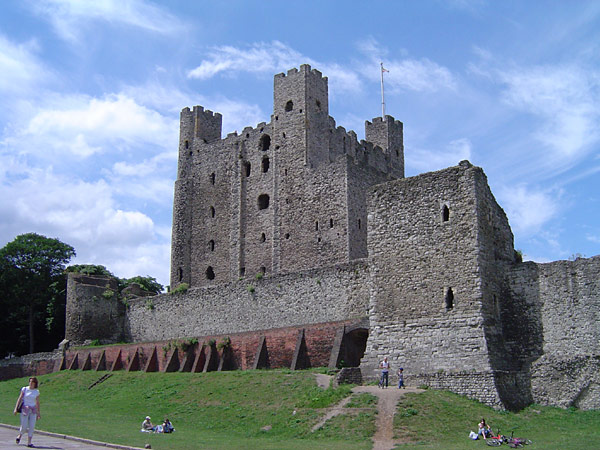
Rochester Castle, a rectangular Norman keep in England.

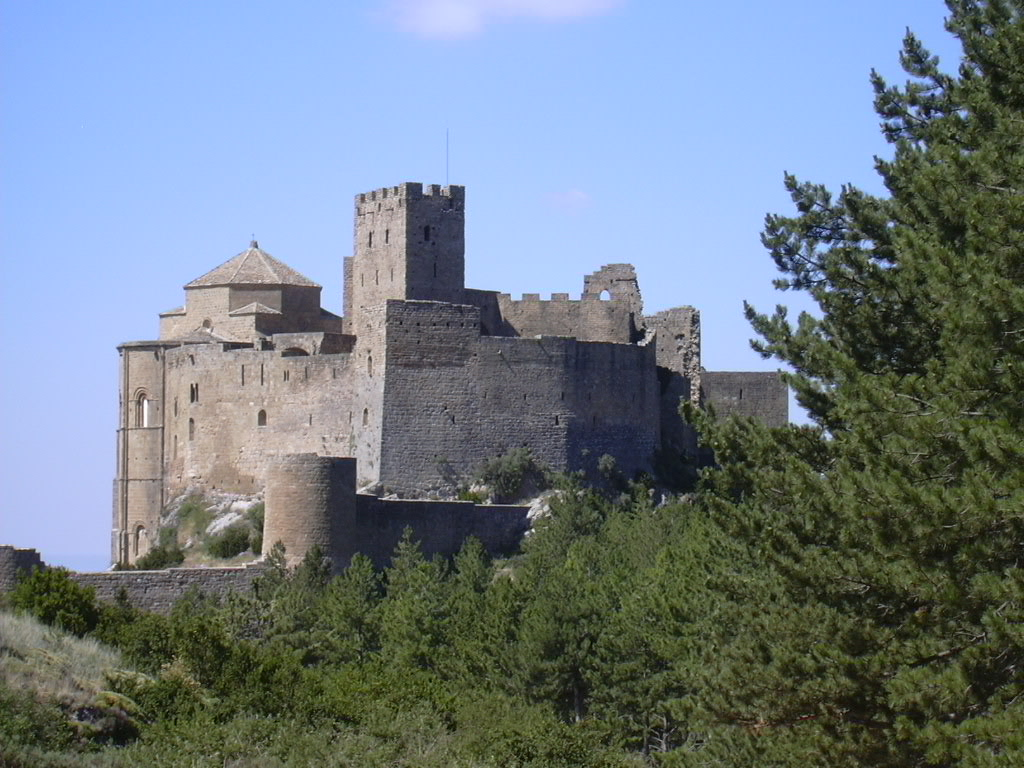
The irregularly shaped Loarre Castle in the Pyrenees, Spain.

=== Walled castles and palaces ===
Other castles begun in the 11th century were built on elevated sites that took advantage of the steep slopes for defense, rather than on moats. The central tower became the final defensive layer of the castle, while the main domestic quarters were built against the walls around the perimeter, allowing plenty of room for a variety of functions. Conisborough Castle is an English example, with the shell keep rising on the earlier motte, and a wall with the residential and service quarters built into it, enclosing the bailey. The ruins within the bailey show remains of a great hall with central fireplace, a kitchen and a two storeyed residential block with adjacent latrines. The keep itself contains a room for the lord, complete with a hooded fireplace, while a small vaulted chapel was built into the thick outer wall of the keep. Ludlow Castle, Shropshire begun in the 11th century, was lived in by a number of members of the Tudor royal family and had both its fortifications and living quarters improved over several centuries.

The Hohenstaufen Castle St Ulrich at Ribeauvillé, Alsace, and Castle Trifel at Annweiler are examples of this type of castles with comfortable living quarters. Münzenberg Castle is remarkable in having two tall keeps. It has a two encircling walls, with an ornate palace built into the wall of the upper ward, with galleries of mullioned windows looking out over the valley.

Other less fortified dwellings, such as the Palaces of Kaiserwerth, Gelnhausen, Landsberg and Goslar, were constructed on more accessible sites, and were in regular use by the imperial court or officials. They have large halls, atriums, colonnaded balconies and courtyards surrounded by arcades, similar to monastic cloisters. These complexes, where they have survived without the over-zealous Romantic restoration of the 19th century seen at Goslar, are buildings of great architectural refinement.

Many town walls, monastic precincts and palaces had gatehouses built with a guardroom or living quarters above a large archway. One of the earliest is the gateway of Lorsch Abbey, the lower part of which has three openings like a Roman triumphal arch, while the upper part, of polychrome brick, has detailing resembling half-timbered house, the effect enhanced by the large steeply pitched slate roof. By contrast the gatehouse of the Abbey of Bury St Edmunds resembles a church tower. Many Romanesque gates are set into the walls of Italian cities. These are invariably of fine masonry and battlemented but otherwise without ornamentation.

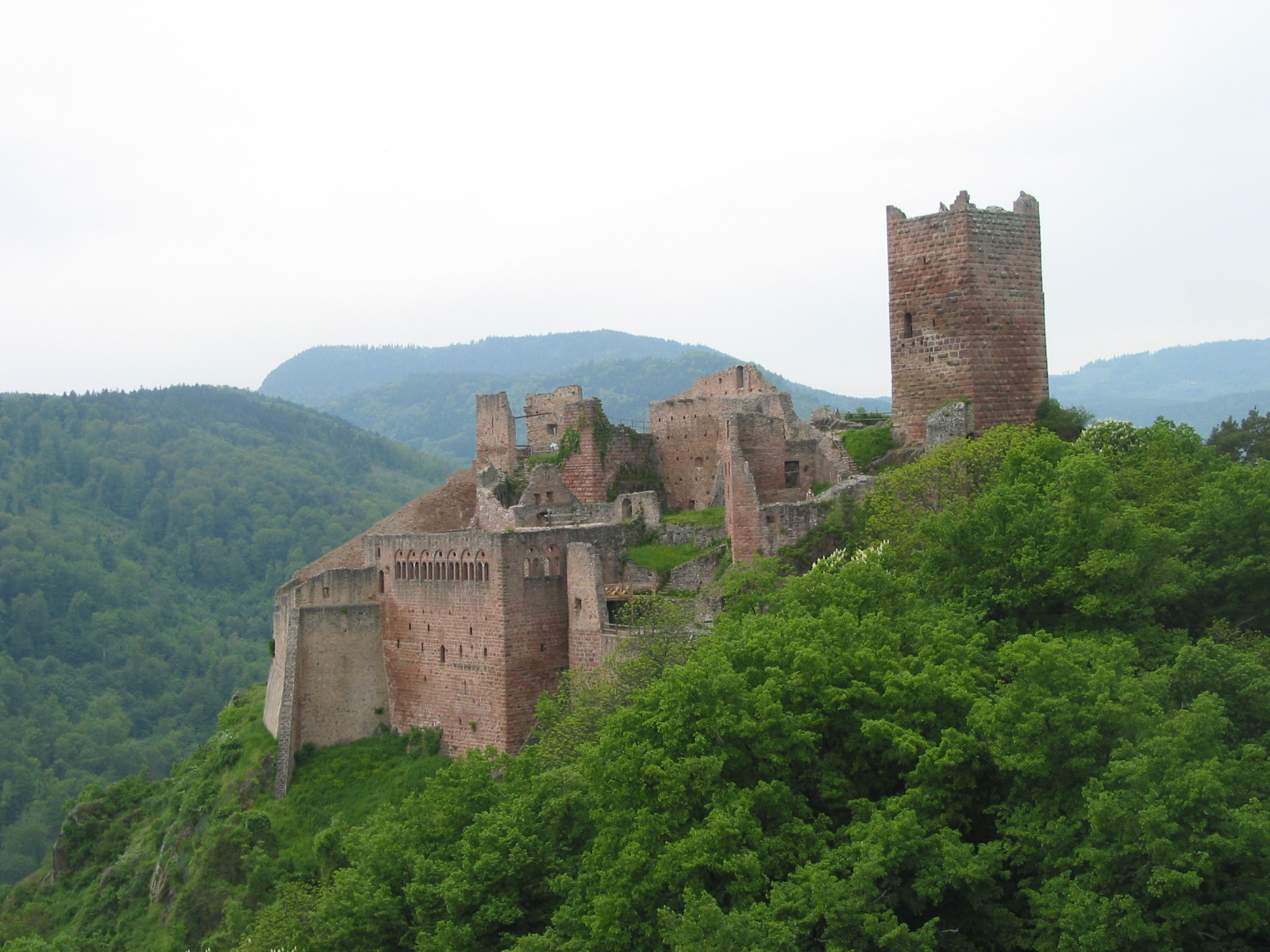
Castle St Ulrich is the best preserved of the Romanesque castles of Alsace.

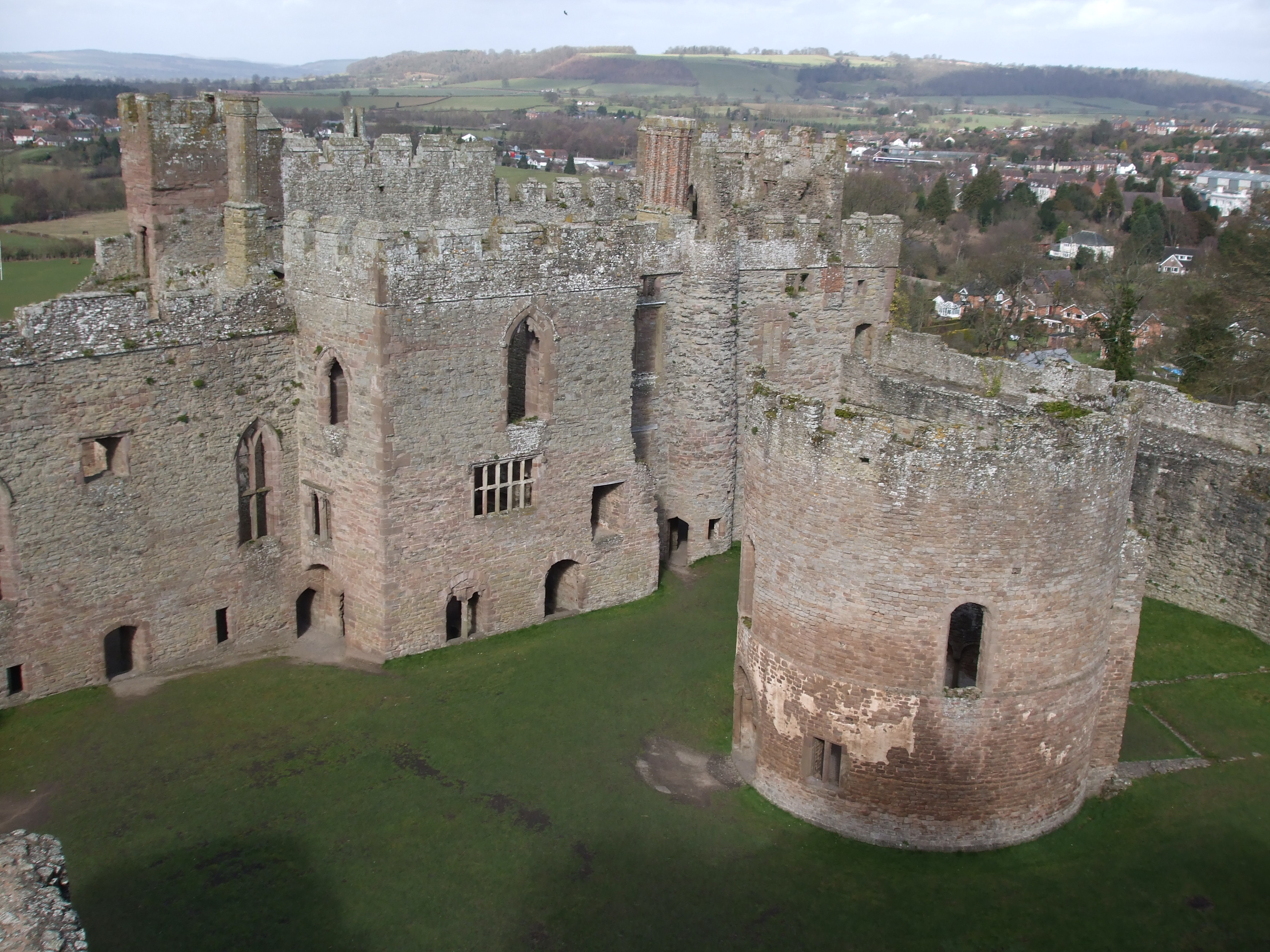
Ludlow Castle reveals its long history in the windows of its domestic quarters.

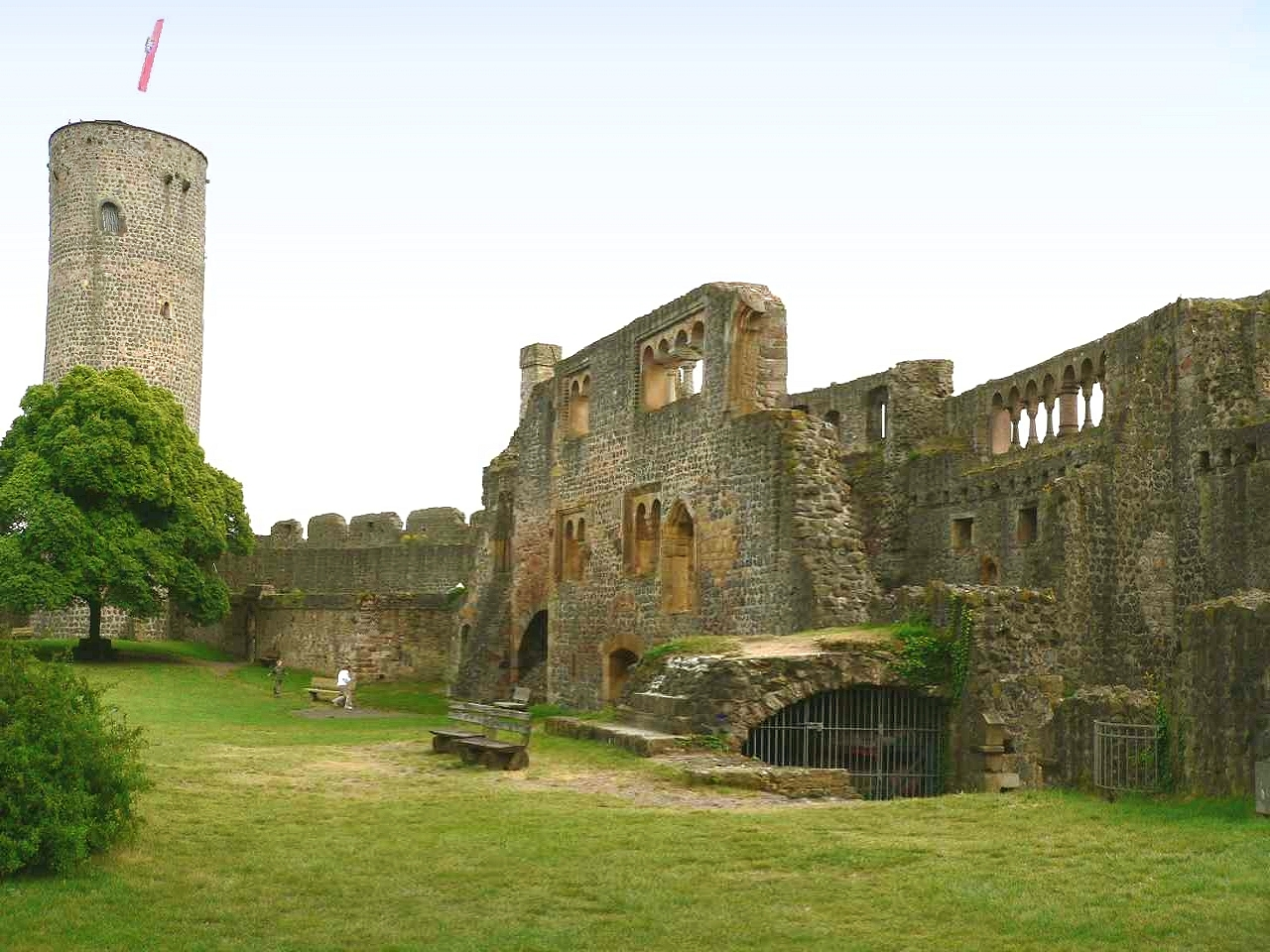
The ornate palace and tall narrow keep in the upper ward of Münzenberg Castle.

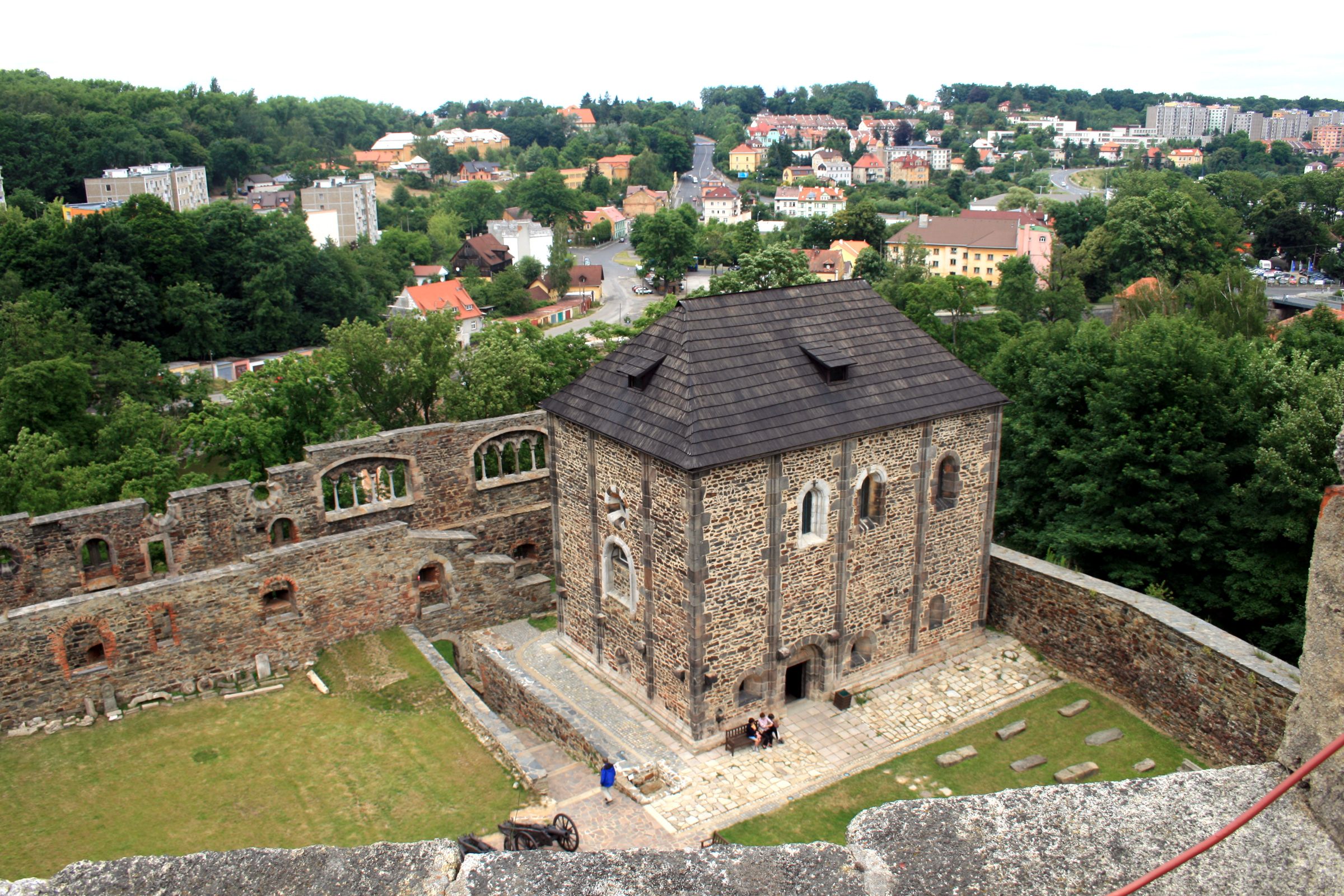
Cheb Castle, Czech Republic, has retained intact the Chapel of St Erhard and St Ursula.

== Domestic buildings ==
=== Characteristics ===
Few houses of the Romanesque period have survived across Europe. One reason is that many of them were built of wooden or half timbered construction. A number of half timbered houses in Germany at Esslingen, Bad Wimpfen and Schwäbisch Hall have been shown to date from this period. The houses that are still standing are mostly of stone, like the house at Bad Munstereifel in Germany, the houses in Lincolnshire, England, and the houses of the village of Saint-Guilhem-le-Désert, Languedoc-Roussillon, France.

One of the simplest types of Romanesque house was the "long house". These were typically built of wood and thatch, were of a single story and housed both the family and the livestock. The long house had doors in either side, making a passage dividing the living quarters of the family from that of the animals. The living room had a central hearth, with smoke holes in the gable. There is an extant stone long house of this plan at Bad Kösen, Germany

Long house or hall

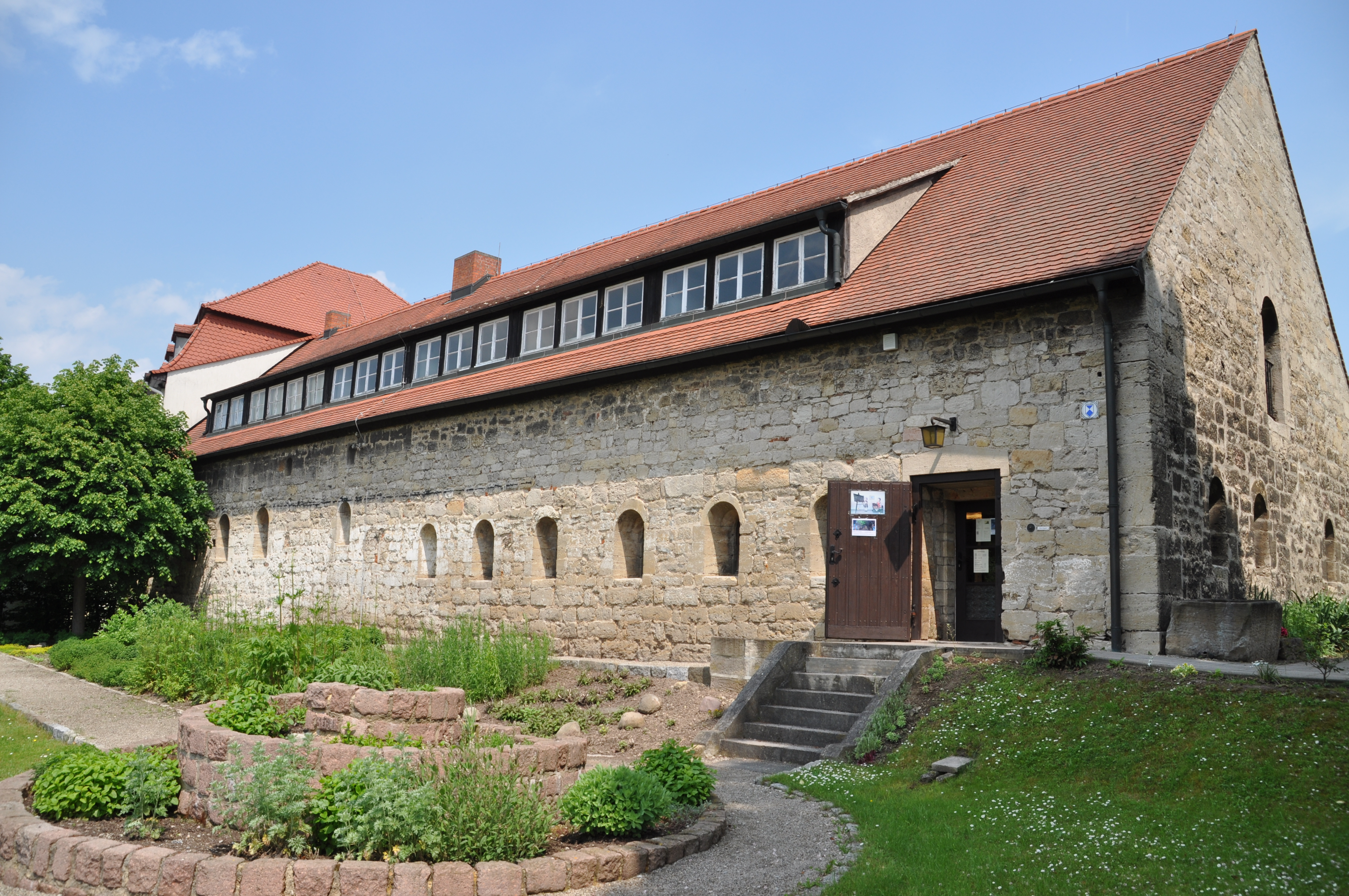
Romanesque long house at Bad Kösen, Germany.

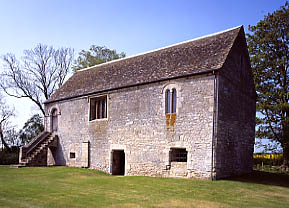
Manor house at Boothby Pagnell, Lincolnshire, England.

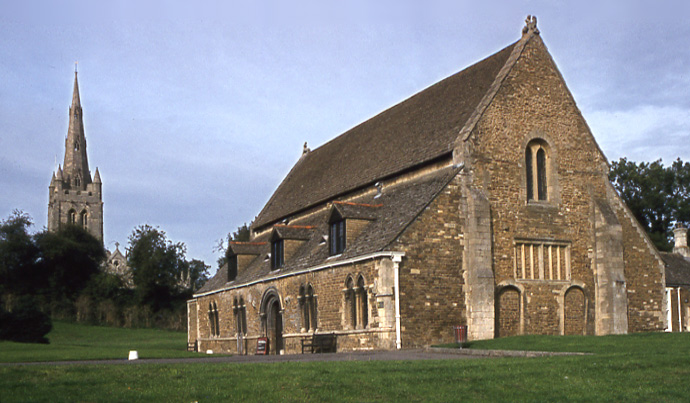
The great hall of Oakham Castle, England.

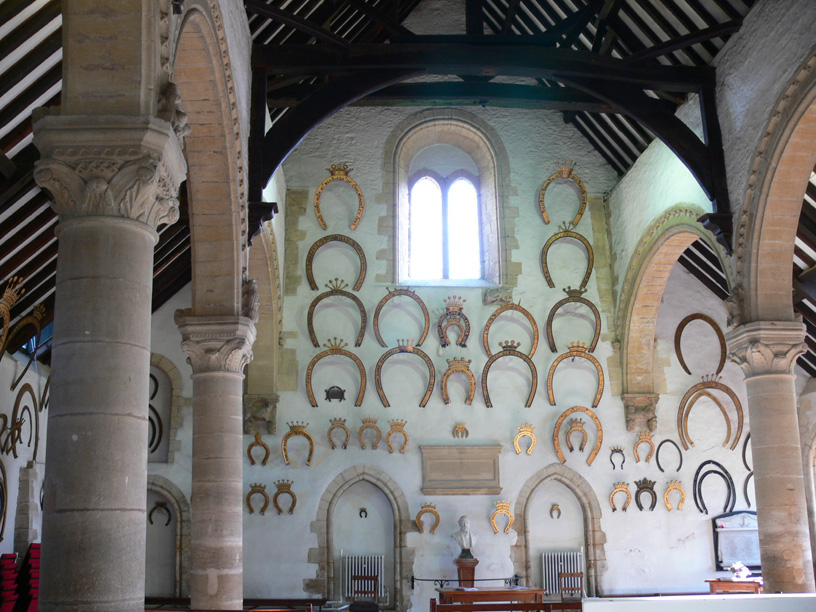
The interior of Oakham Castle.

A substantial stone-built Romanesque house, like the Romanesque castle keep, usually had the main living space on the first floor, elevated above an undercroft. This undercroft might take two forms, either an enclosed cellar-like basement, or an open loggia. It might serve for storage, as a stable or for commercial purposes, depending on the location and owners of the house. This arrangement is apparent at the Manor House at Boothby Pagnell, and St Mary's Guild, both in Lincolnshire, England.

The living space on the first floor was, in the simpler houses, a single room, with access by an external staircase of stone or wood. Early houses might have an open stone hearth and a smoke hole in the roof. The interiors of houses developed with separate chambers and partitions of stone or wood. Additional rooms might be accessed from an external wooden gallery, cantilevered from holes and corbels along the walls, as seen the 13th-century house at Poreč, Croatia.

Doorways might have a stone or wooden lintel, but were often arched, and in finer houses had mouldings, decorative carvings and perhaps colonnettes and carved capitals around the doors. A common form of doorway in Italy had shaped corbels projecting inward to support a stone transom, above which rose an open arch. This form continued into the Gothic period and evolved into the fanlight. The simplest window were narrow and round-topped. Windows into important rooms were often paired arched openings, divided by a colonnette or mullion. Some houses have paired mullioned windows set under lintels rather than arches, while in France there are a number of houses which have rows of square topped windows divided by mullions and piers, set within the framework of a horizontal course, and forming a gallery.

=== City houses and tower houses ===
Houses built within medieval cities were restricted in space, often by the fact that the town was encircled by walls. As a response to this, houses in cities were usually multi-storeyed. The simplest of these buildings were extremely cramped for space, having just a single room on each floor, accessible only by steep ladder-like stairs. In some cases exterior staircases gave onto wooden balconies which served the upper floors of a whole row of tall narrow houses, as is evidenced by the rows of holes and supporting corbels that are found in the walls of a great many Italian medieval buildings. Likewise, small inner courts which provided light and air were communal spaces for surrounding buildings. They also provided for the collection of rainwater. Narrow multi-storeyed houses of the Romanesque period have survived in a number of cities, with the greatest number occurring in Italy, where they are generally built of stone or brick and have often been extended at later dates, or had their Romanesque openings altered, making them indistinguishable from later medieval buildings. Casa Dante, thought to have been the home of Dante Alighieri, in Florence, is a good surviving example. In Germany the Baumburg Tower in Regensburg is an elegant late 13th-century example showing elements that are transitional between Romanesque and Gothic in its decorative window openings which are different on each floor, and contrast with the smoothly stuccoed walls. Another house, at Karden, has similar features but in form combines a tower house and a hall. The extremes of tall city housing are found in San Gimignano, Pavia and Bologna where families rivaled each other in the construction of very tall tower houses. In Bologna only the Torre Garisenda, (1100), 130 ft and the Torre Asinelli, (1109), 225 ft, have survived, twenty tower houses survive in Pavia, many of them lowered in height in the modern age, while the small walled hill-town of San Gimignano contains fourteen towers and the stumps of very many more, having once bristled with them. It has been suggested that the tall houses of this city served the practical purpose of suspending bolts of cloth for drying, in the shade rather than in the sun.

Tall houses

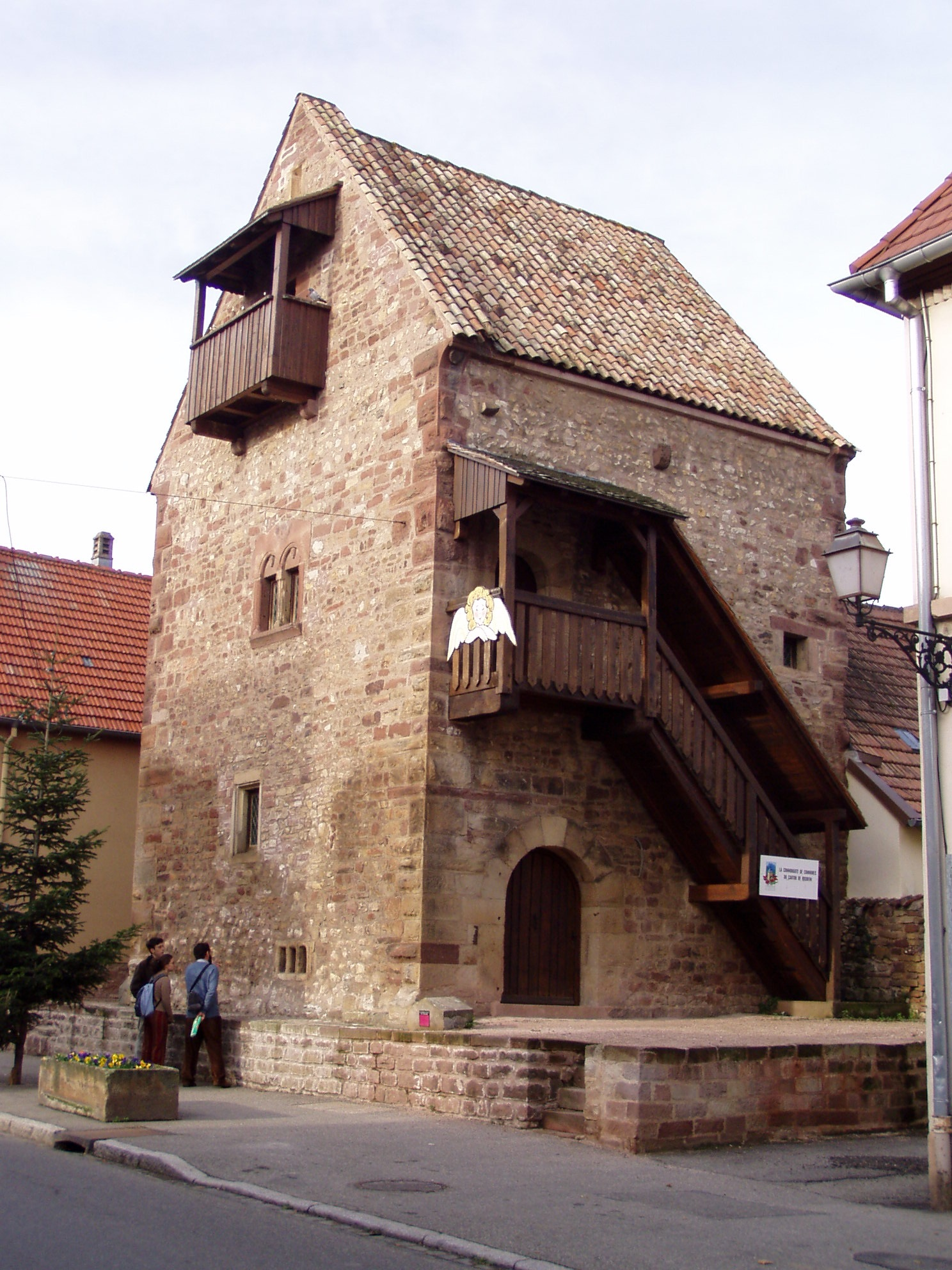
House in Rosheim, France, showing external staircase.

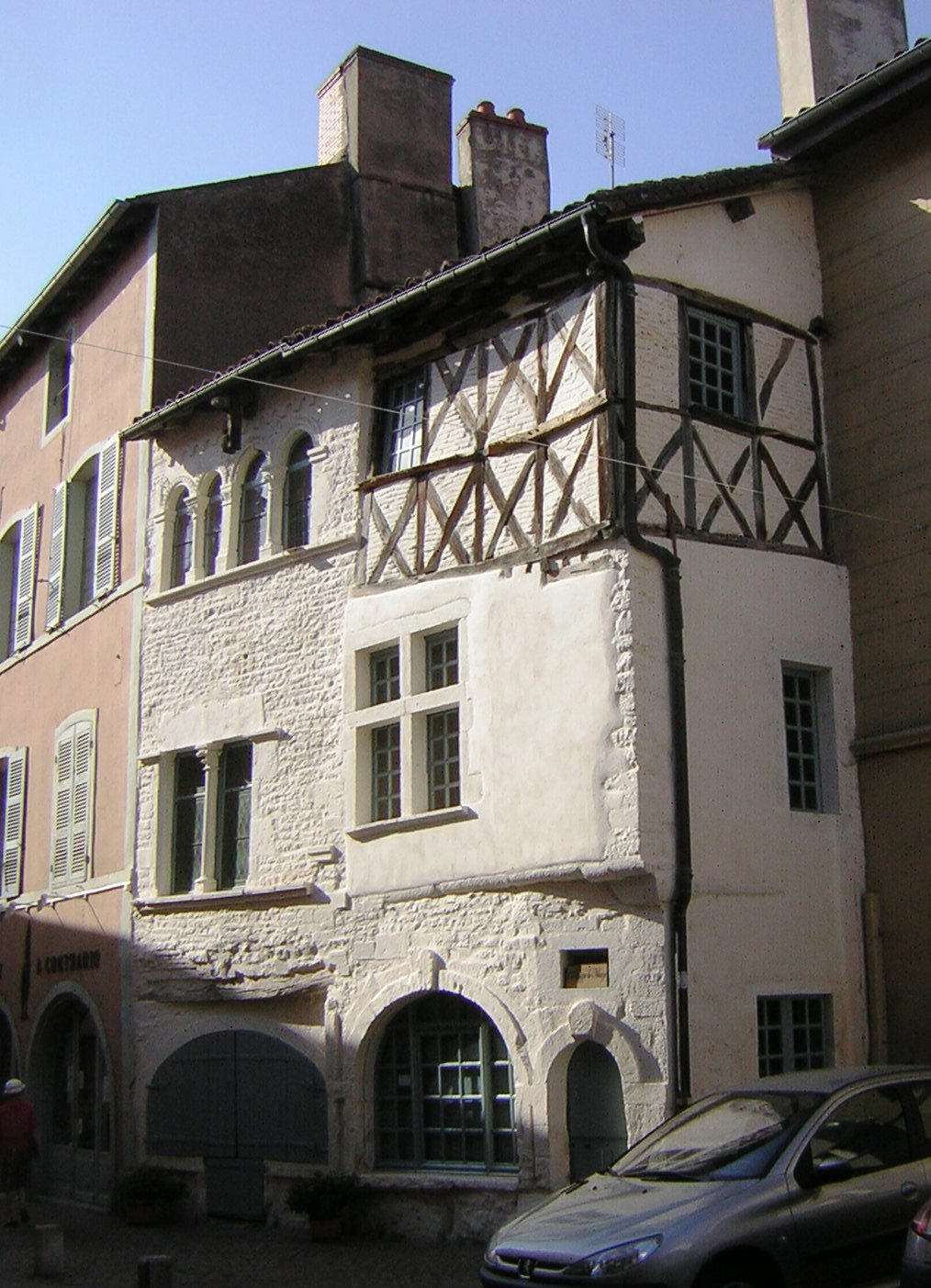
Houses in Cluny, France, one with half-timbering and render.

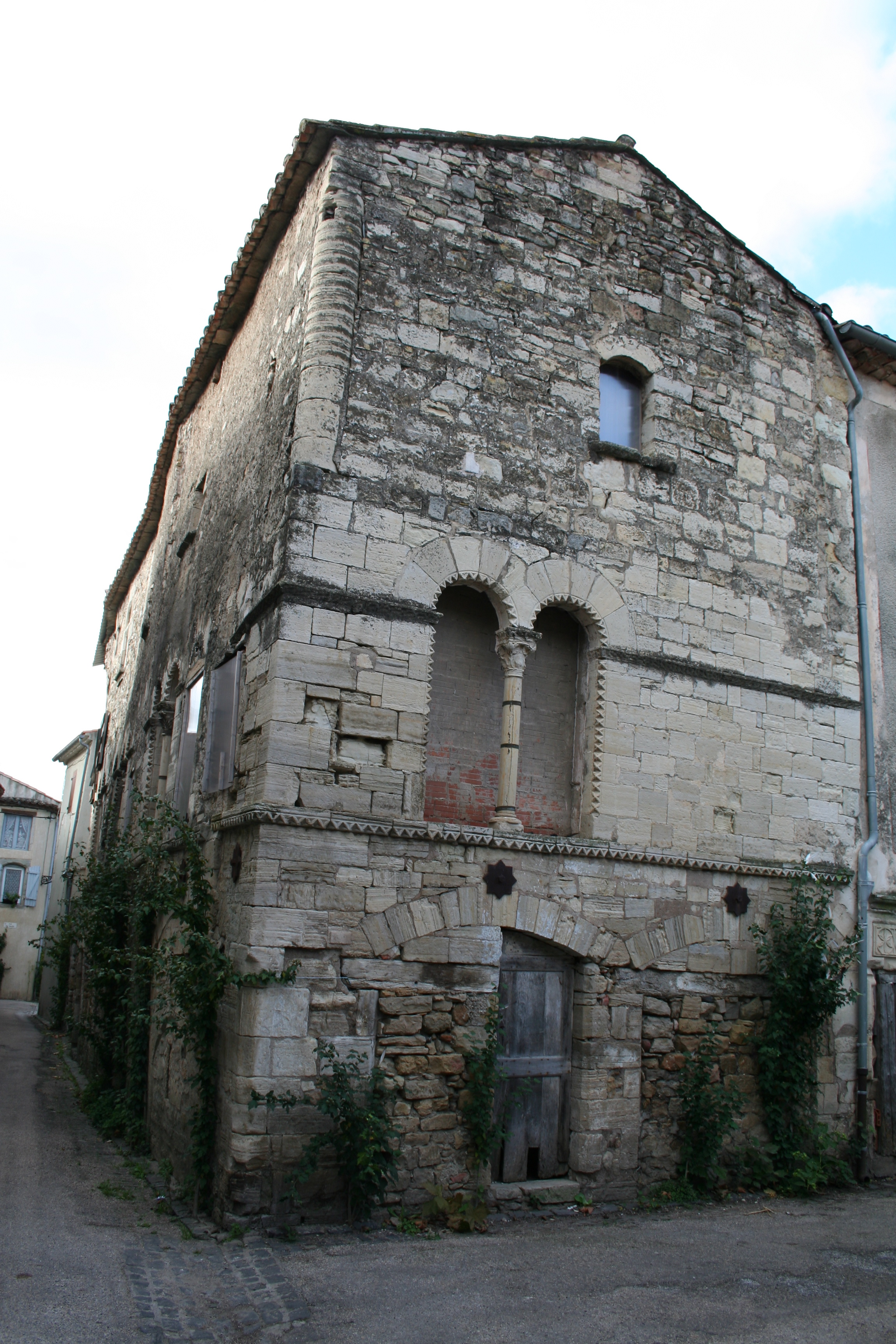
House in Villemagne-l'Argentiere, France, with carved details on doors and windows.

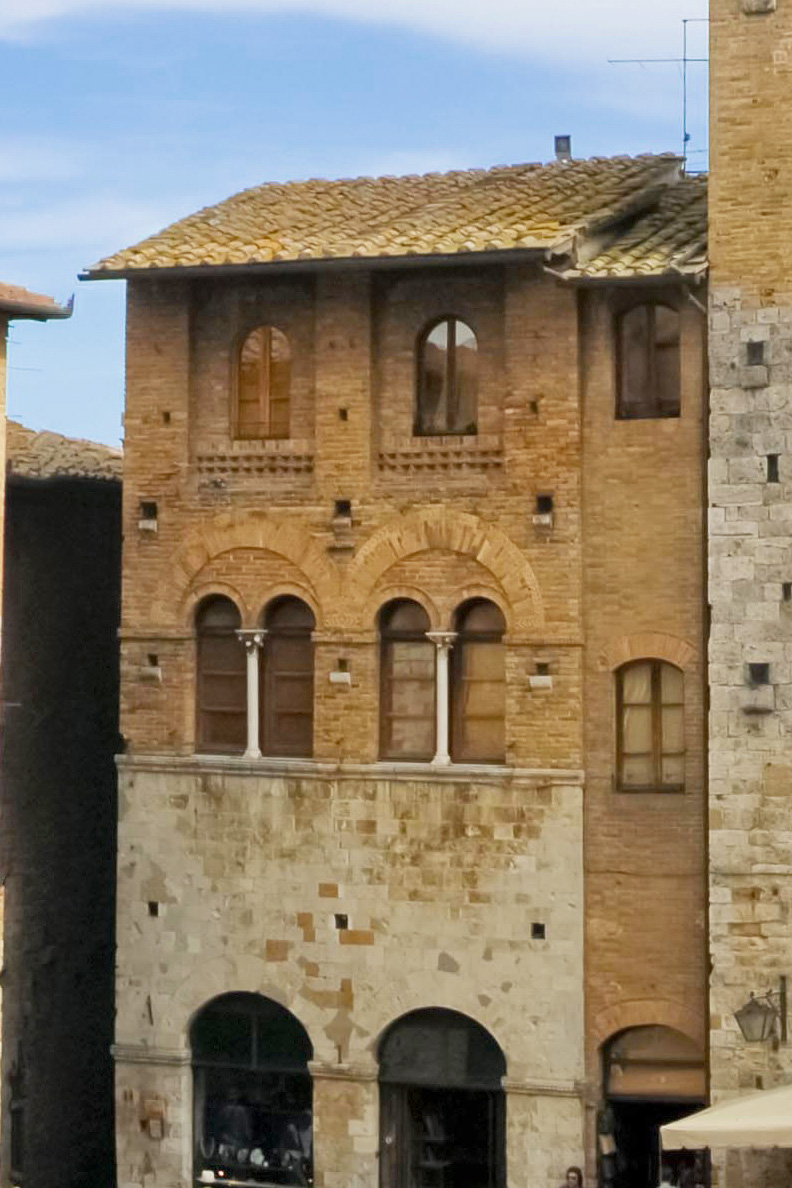
House on the Piazza del Duomo in San Gimignano, Italy.

=== Town houses ===
In France there are a number of locations at which clusters of Romanesque houses have survived. A group exists in the village of Saint-Guilhem-le-Désert, near the ancient monastery. There are a significant number in Cluny, including plastered timber-framed examples. The finest Romanesque town-house is at St-Antonin-Noble-Val, Tarn-et-Garonne, France, built by the Granolhet family in the early 12th century. This substantial house of three storeys has a broad street front, braced on one side by projecting bell tower with typical paired mullioned windows. The ground floor is an open loggia, with an arcade on piers. Across the first floor is a long window or recessed gallery with delicate colonnettes all framed between two continuous horizontal mouldings. On the upper floor is a row of three mullioned windows.

In Italy, a significant building of this time is the 12th- or 13th-century Rector's Palace in San Gimignano. This modestly sized building, fronting onto a square, has a symmetrical façade, a low gable that retains the appearance of a Classical pediment, and a portal that has a semi-circular arch raised above a broad lintel supported on corbels, a common feature of medieval Italian domestic architecture and also seen at the House of Dante. This house has a doorway, also with arch and lintel, between the two mullioned windows of its upper floor that once led out onto a balcony, like the one that has been restored on a 13th-century house at Poreč in Istria, Croatia.

The house at Poreč typifies the nature of the few stone houses remaining of this period in that the main living quarters were on the first floor, elevated above a basement or "undercroft", and accessed by an external stone staircase. The house at Poreč has another feature also seen in England, an external chimney breast projects from the upper storey directly above a doorway.

On the aptly named Steep Street that leads up to Lincoln Cathedral (once a great Norman church but almost entirely rebuilt in the Gothic style) are two merchant's houses which are known as "the Jew’s House" and "Aaron the Jew’s House", (c. 1170). Both houses have been much altered and have been fitted with sash windows and shop fronts, but both retain their doorways and both originally had a fireplace to an upper room directly above it, with arches supporting the chimney and framing the door. The details of the mouldings of the arches over the doors and upper windows are of fine craftsmanship.

In Italy a complex of medieval buildings has been restored at the Castle of Monselice (Castello Cini) which includes houses from the 11th, 12th and 13th centuries. The oldest, known as Casa Romanica has two large arches making a loggia at the ground floor, above which rises a plain facade broken only by small windows and a jutting chimney breast. The loggia leads into a large kitchen with rough-hewn wooden columns standing on stone bases and spreading the weight of the wide beams of the upper floor on projecting horizontal brackets. The upper floor has a "great hall" and a smaller room over the loggia with a groin vault. The 12th-century "Castelletto" and 13th-century Ezzolino's Tower have both retained Romanesque characteristics, with the later being built of brick and having more ornate features such as paired mullioned windows on its upper floor.

Romanesque houses in France

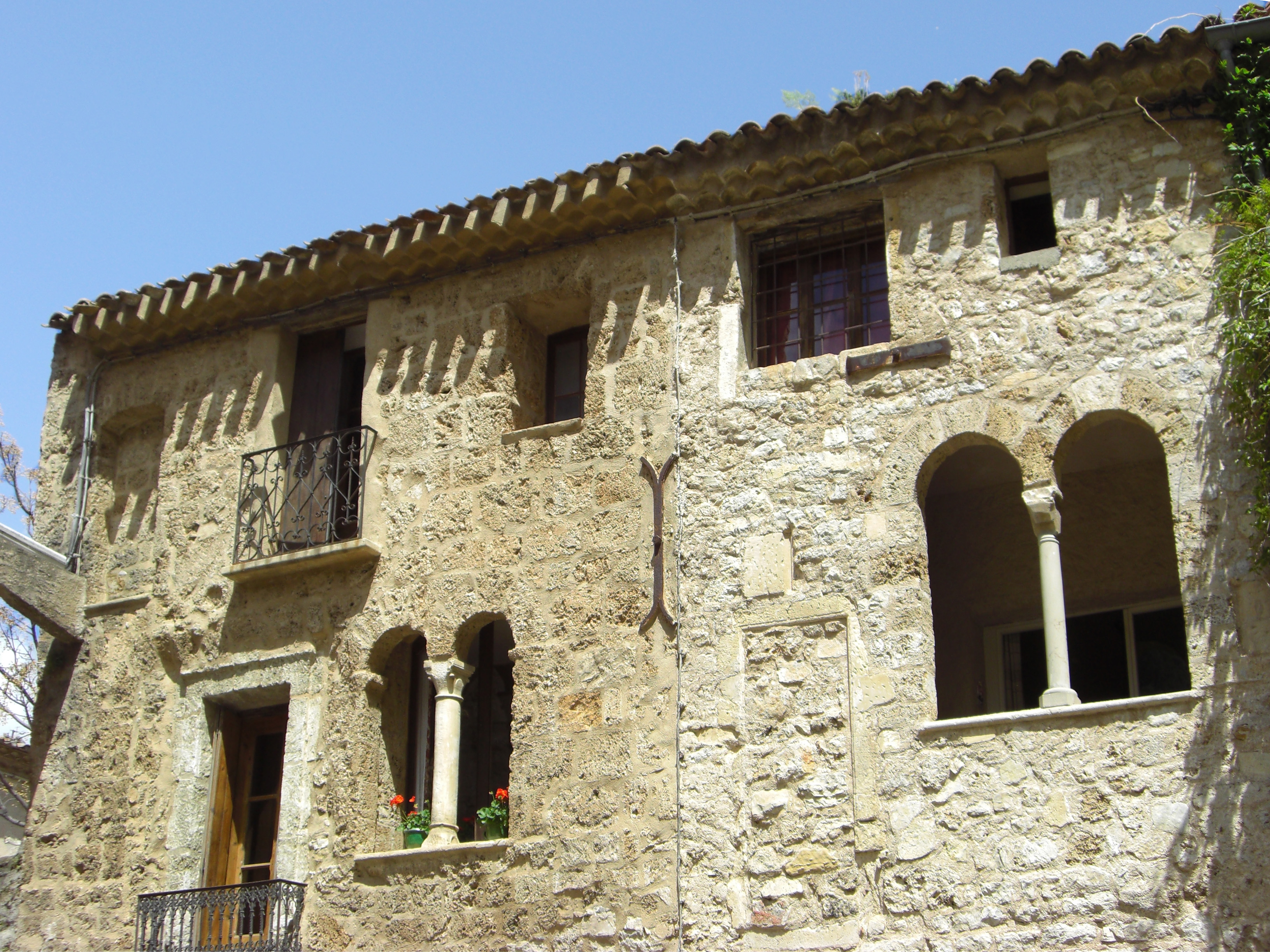
Two houses in Saint-Guilhem-le-Désert.

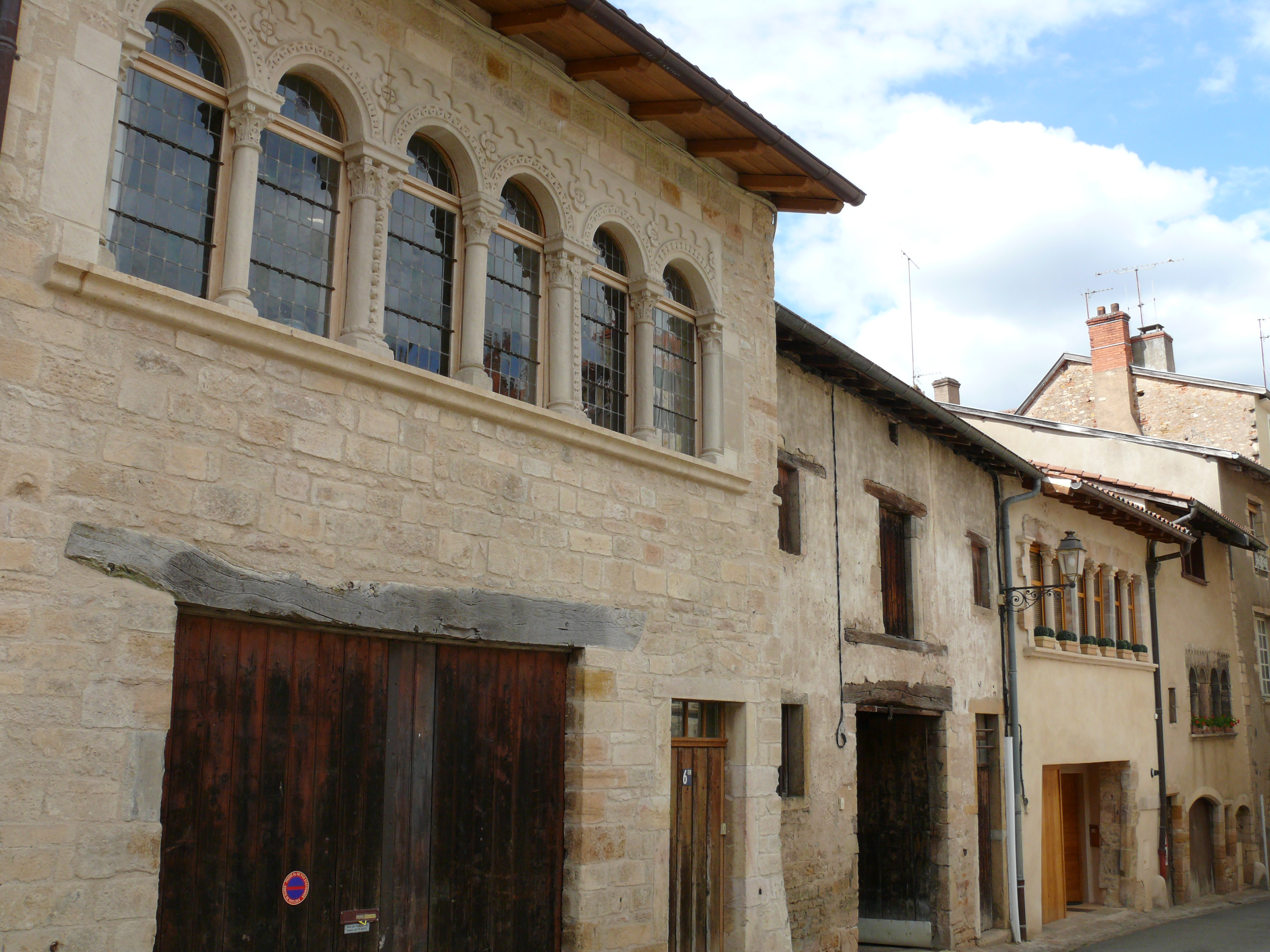
Romanesque house in Cluny.

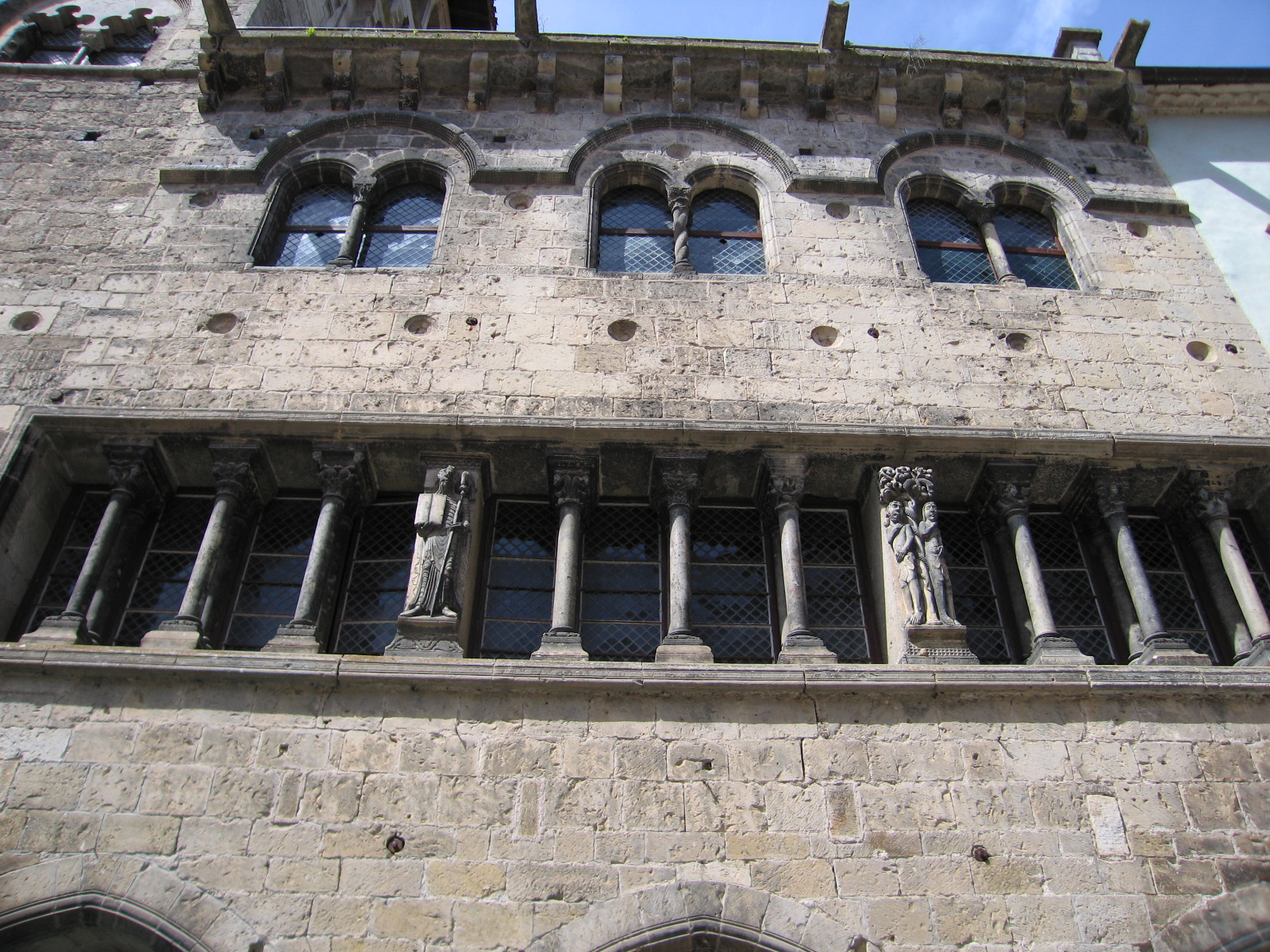
The house of the Vicomte of Saint-Antonin-Noble-Val, (1125).

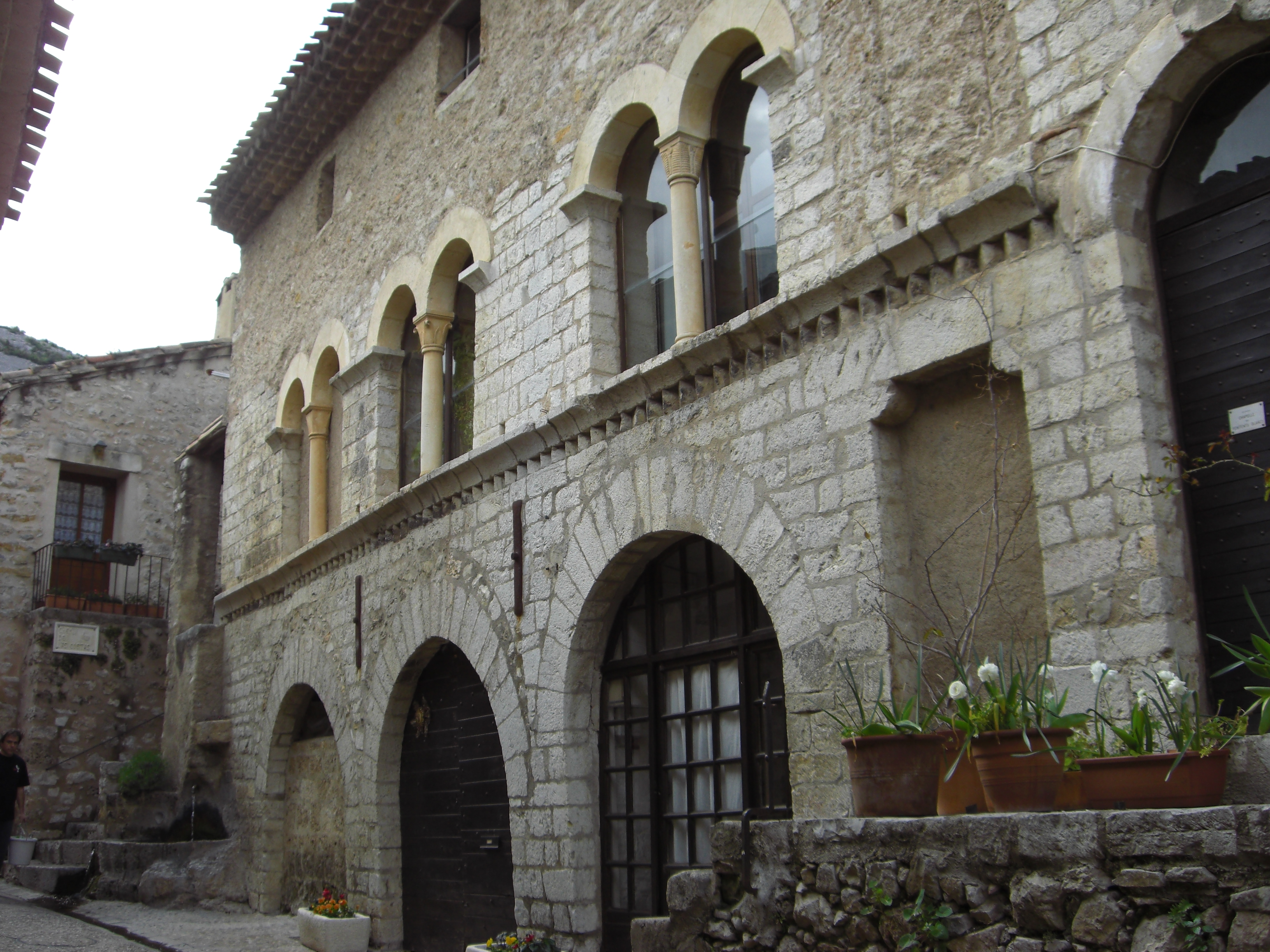
House in the village of Saint-Guilhem-le-Désert.
Romanesque houses in Germany, Croatia, England and Spain

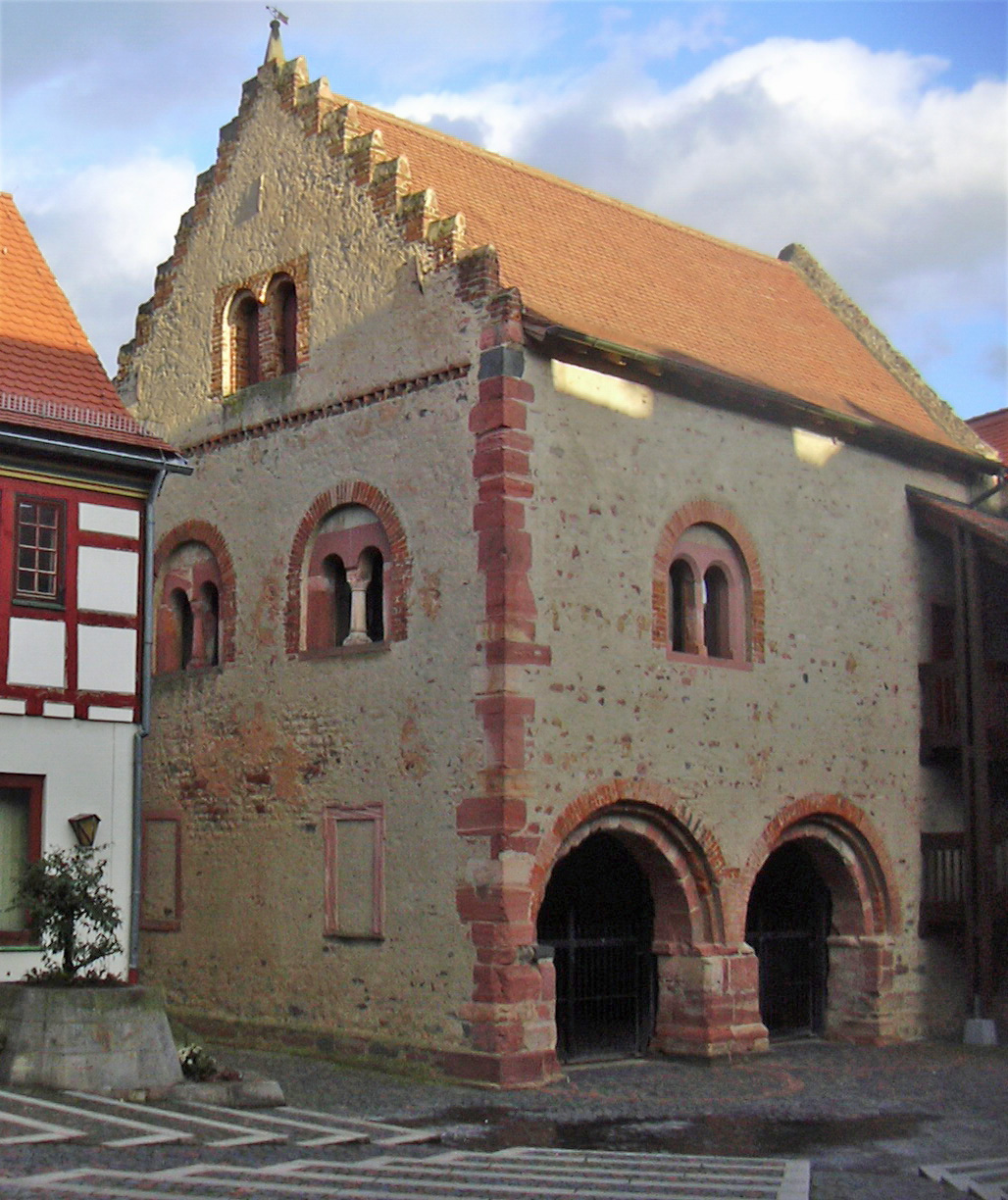
12th-century house of the local ruler in Seligenstadt, Germany.

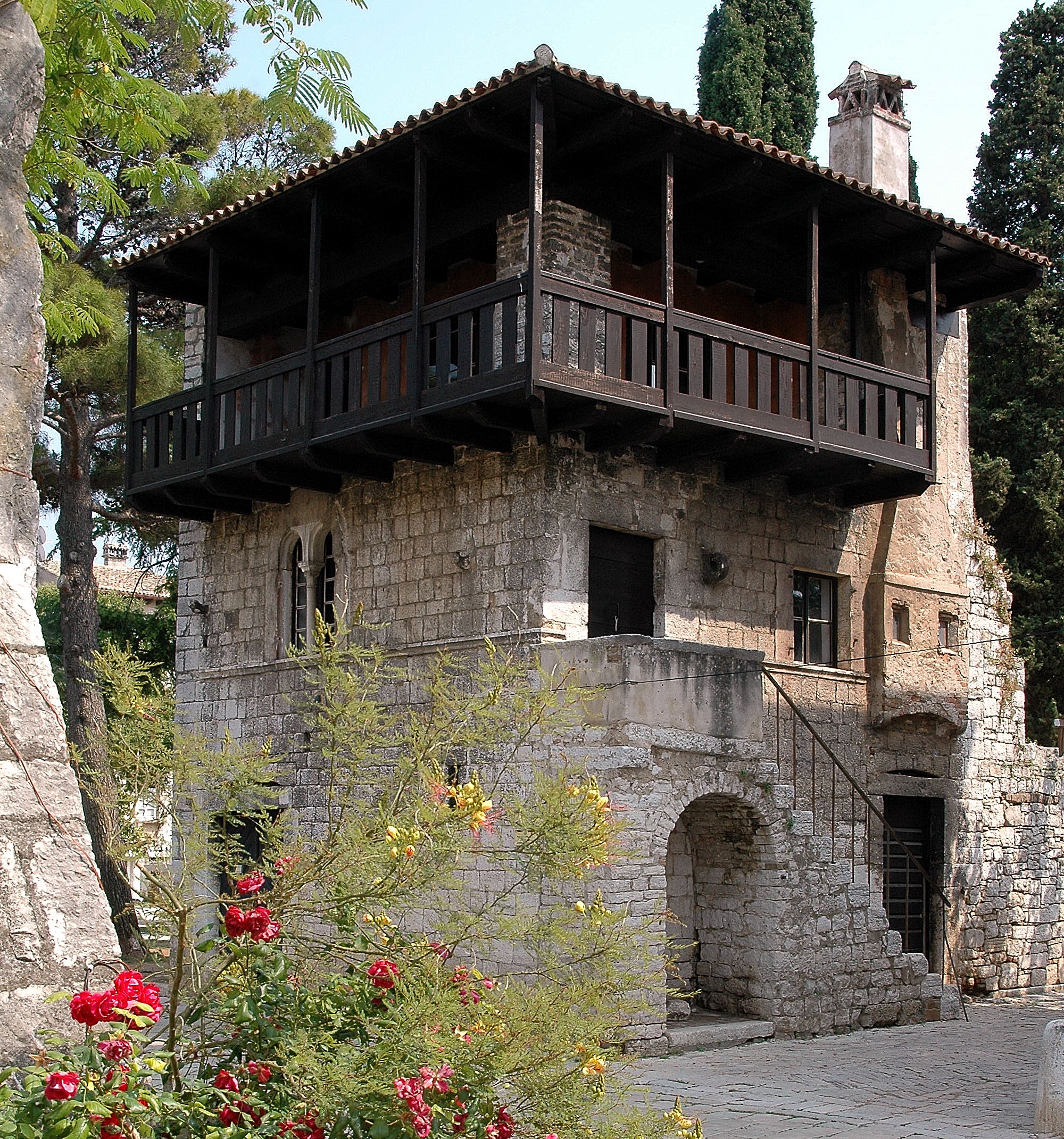
Poreč Romanesque House, Croatia.

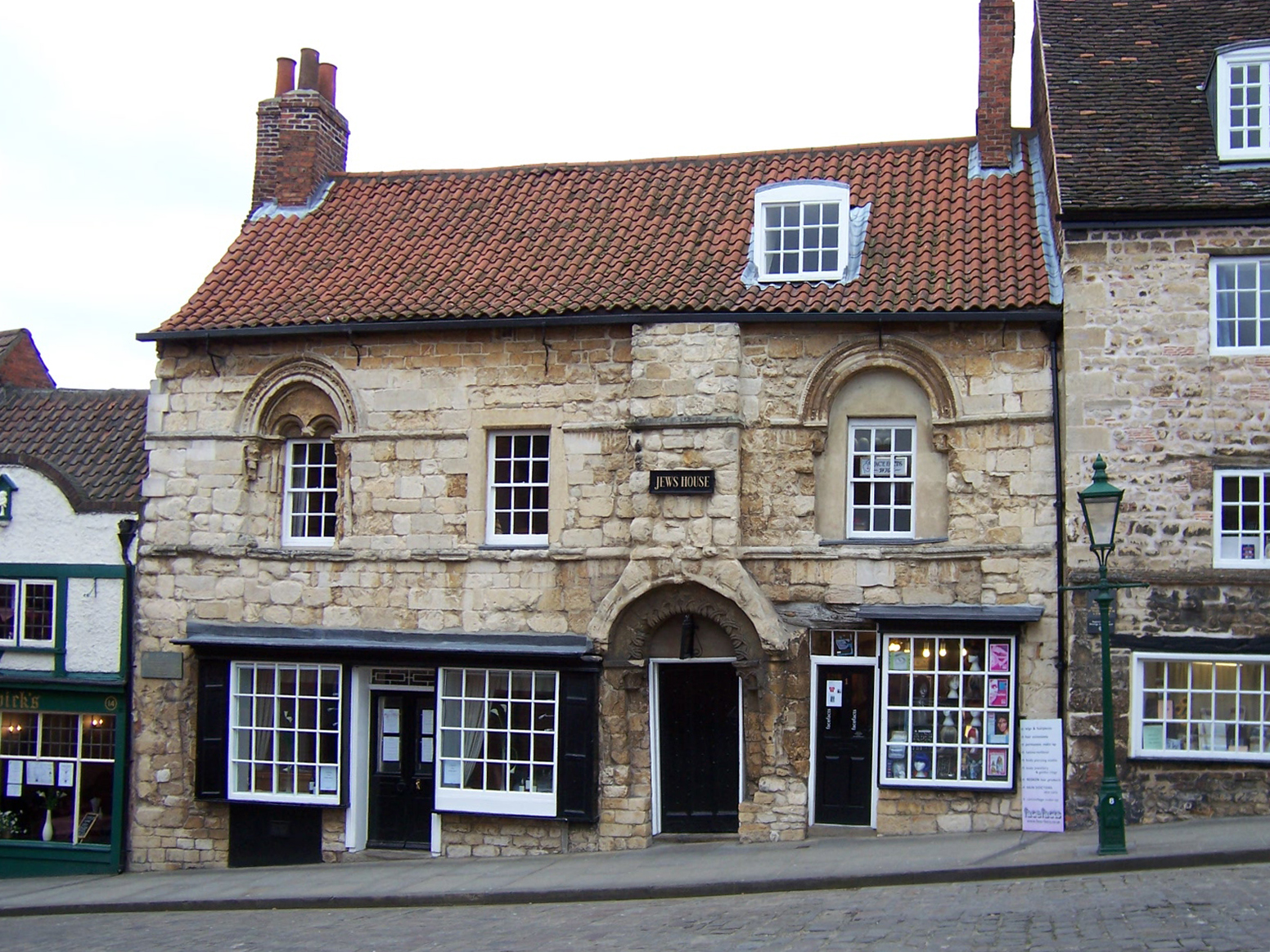
The 12th century Jew's house in Lincoln, England, while carefully conserved and protected, retains all the changes and accretions of later centuries.

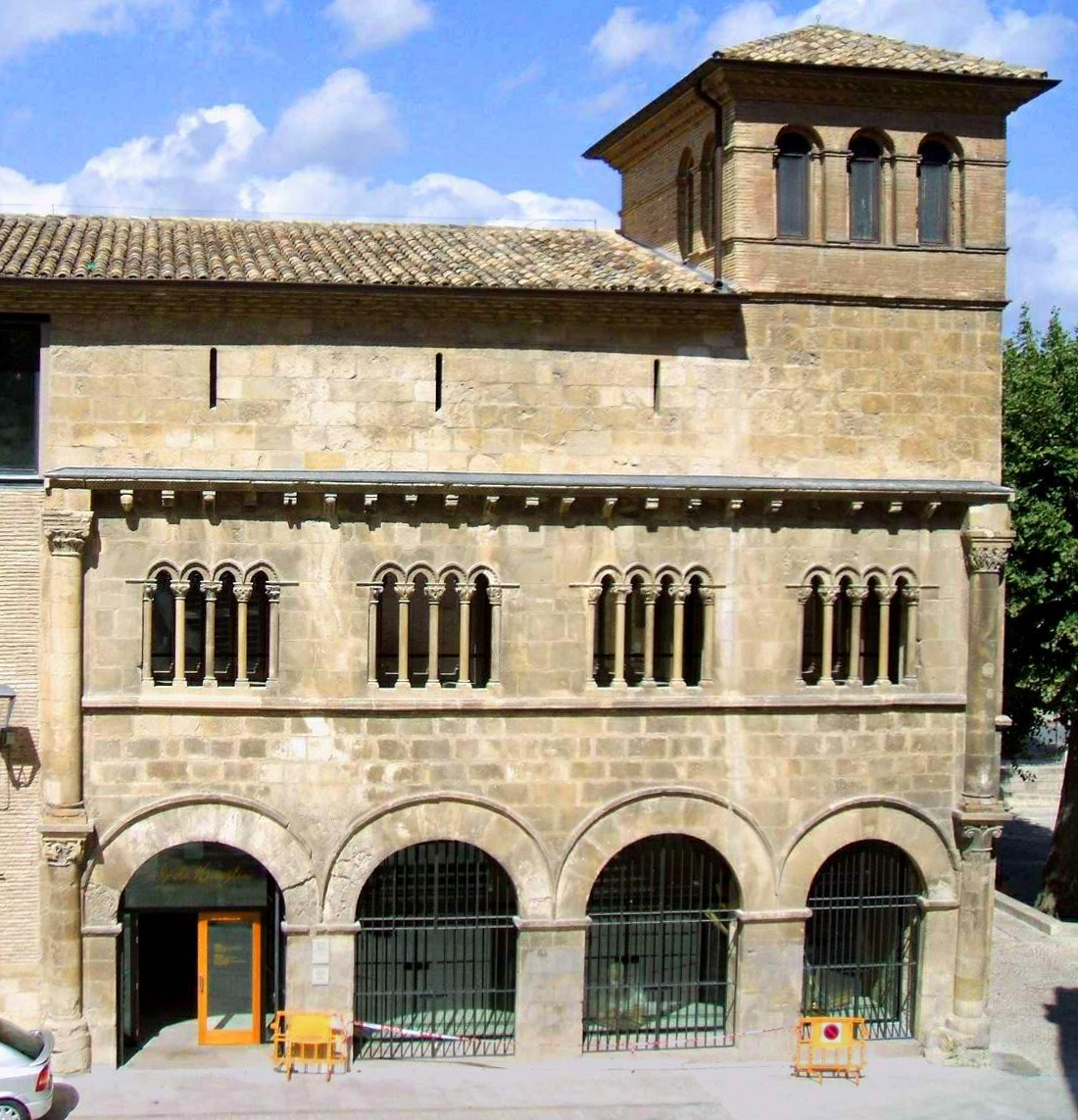
Palace of the Kings of Navarre, Estella, Spain. The tower and upper level are 16th-century additions.

== Merchant palaces and commercial buildings ==
Merchant palaces are essentially city buildings, of initially modest scale but growing in size by the 13th century, where wealthy trading families both lived and carried out their businesses. In Venice a number of these buildings remain, with their open basement loggias stretching along the main waterway, the Grand Canal, and the principal rooms of the piano nobile opening onto an arcaded balcony overlooking the view. The round-headed arches are often stilted, and the openings on the upper floors are grouped in patterns with those to the sides being differentiated from the grouping at the centre. The details are handled with a lightness and delicacy that typifies Venetian medieval architecture. While the structures are brick, the favoured material for architectural decoration was marble, which is elaborately carved into intricate details, or laid on the surface as patterned veneers. Like St Mark's Basilica, the architecture of the houses shows a Byzantine influence. They include the Ca' Farsetti, Ca' da Mosto, Ca' Loredan, and the Fondaco dei Turchi.

Fondaco dei Turchi was built as a private palace for the wealthy Pesaro family and, like the other palazzi along the Grand Canal, was designed to facilitate business, with its long arcade stretching along the main waterway. It was one of the most imposing buildings in Venice during the late Medieval period, and was used by the Senate to accommodate visiting dignitaries. It was later leased to Turkish traders, hence its name. Although heavily restored during the 19th century, the building demonstrates typical features of Venetian Romanesque: the stilted, round-topped arches of the arcade, the pavilions at each end of the building, the upper gallery, the crenellations and patera, marble roundels or foliate ornaments applied to the exterior walls.

The Northern European version of the merchant house can be seen at the Overstolzenhaus, in Cologne, with six stories of windows and crow-stepped gables. While the open loggias of houses were used for trade and those of town halls were widely used for markets, (see below) other commercial buildings were purpose-built, sometimes by city authorities, to facilitate trade, with an important example of an extant commercial building being the Korenstapelhuis (English: Old Corn Warehouse) in Ghent, Belgium, which is close by the quay and has a wide front with two rows of openings to facilitate the handling and stacking of bags of grain.

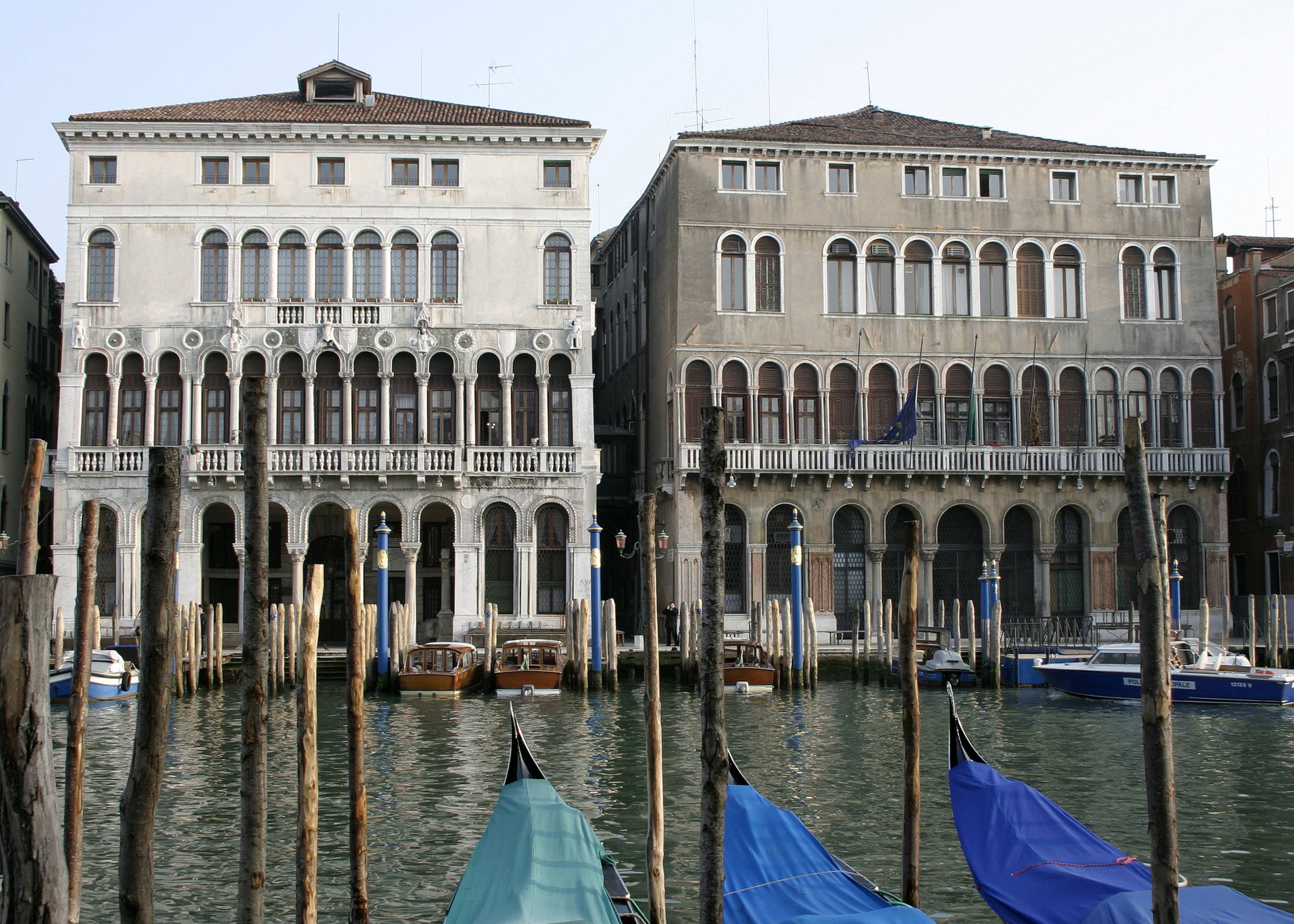
Ca' Loredan, and Ca' Farsetti, Venice. The two lower floors are from early 13th century.

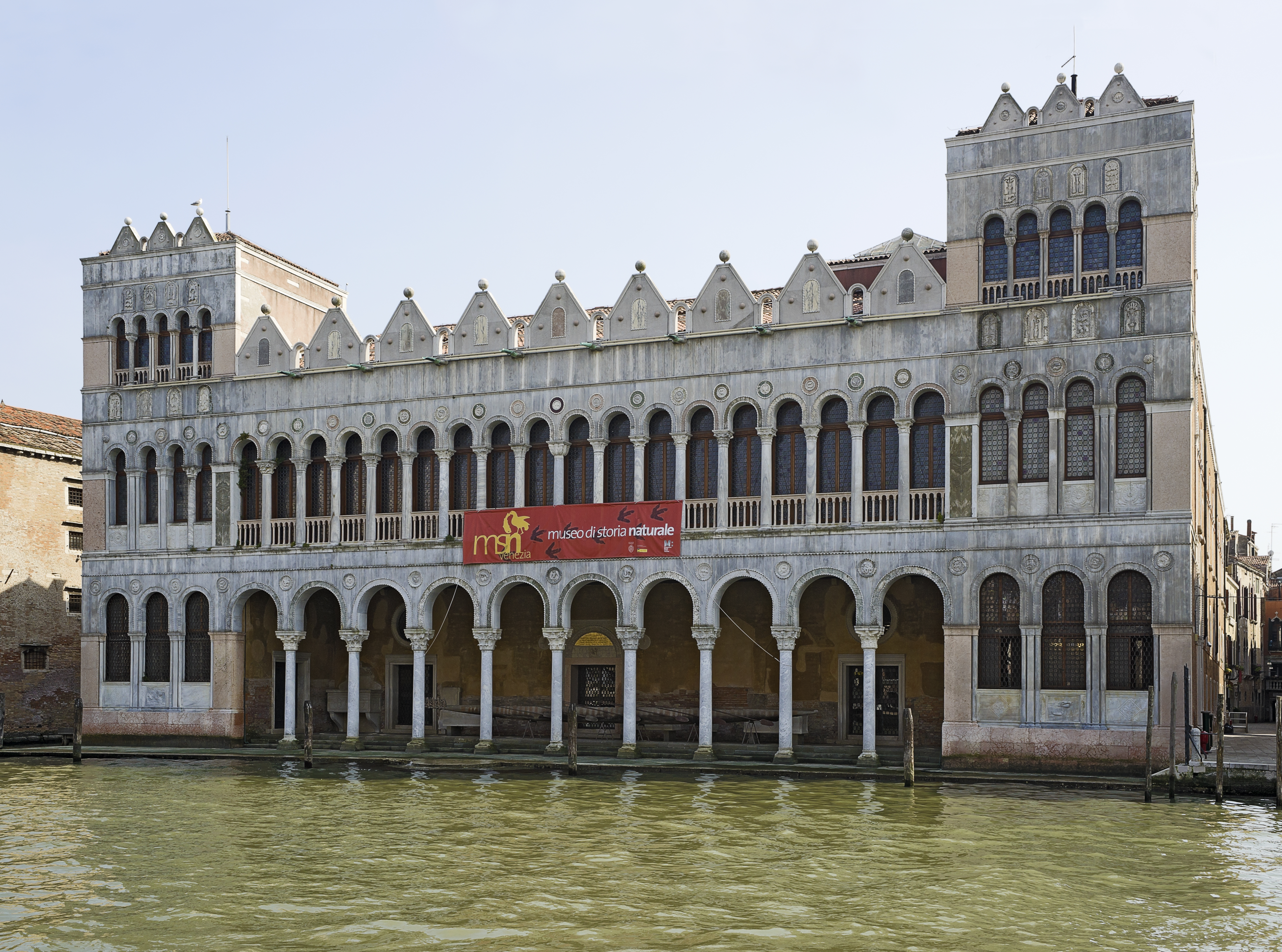
Fondaco dei Turchi (early 13th century) on the Grand Canal, Venice.

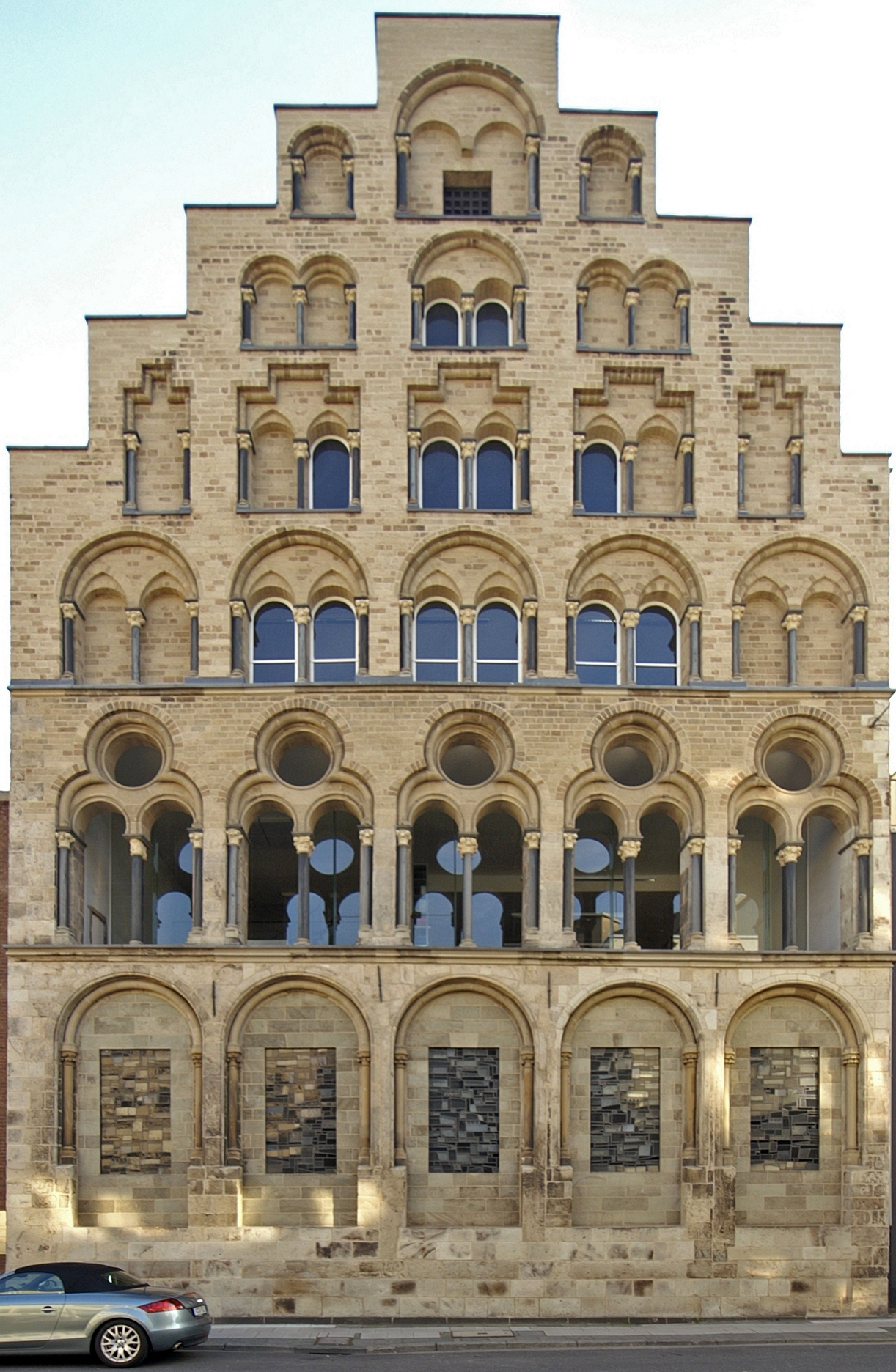
House Overstolz, Cologne, Germany.

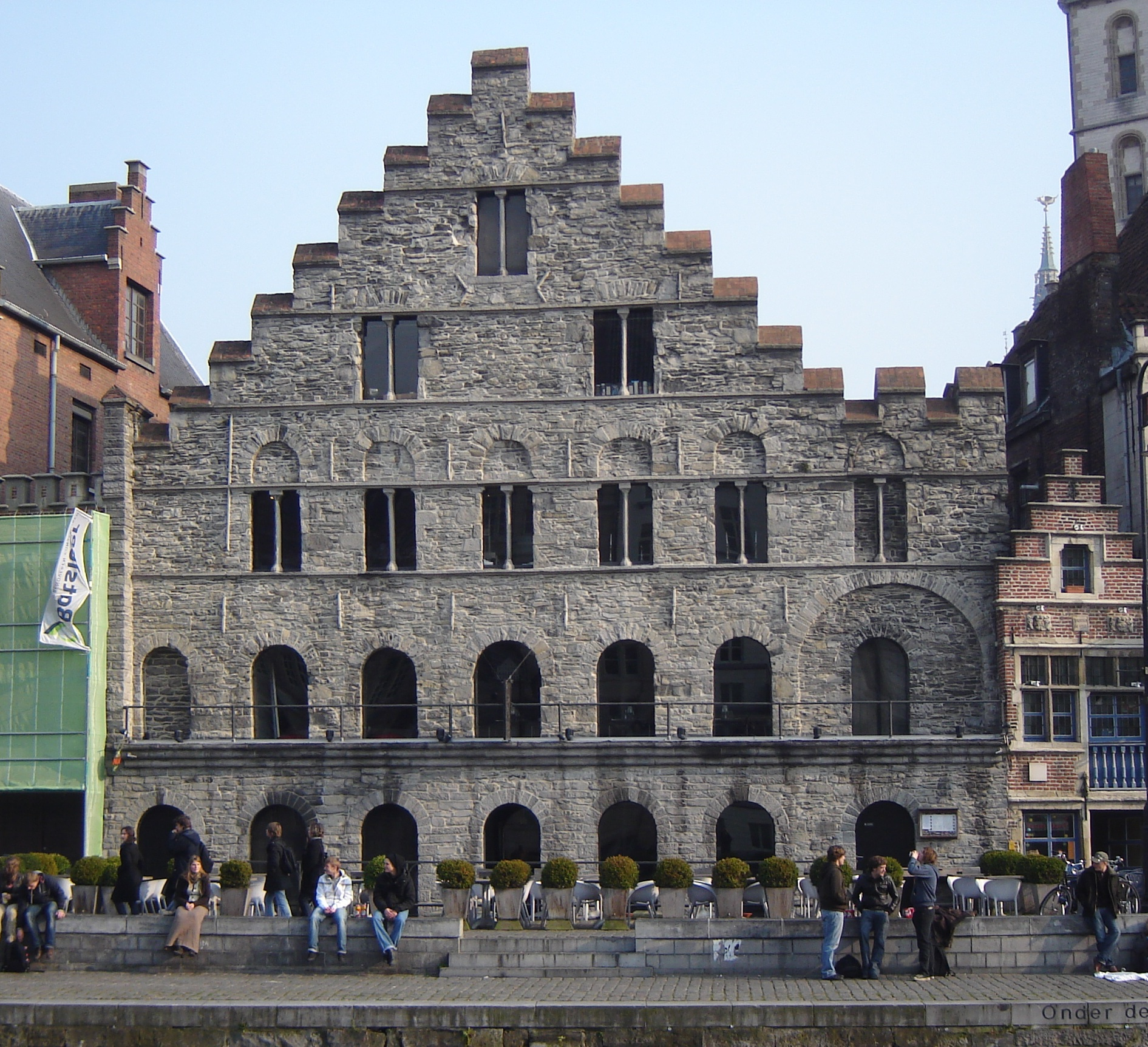
Korenstapelhuis, Ghent, Belgium.

== Civic buildings ==
In Italy a number of important Romanesque civic buildings have remained largely intact and have continued in use. It is characteristic of Italian Medieval architecture that there is no clear break between the Romanesque and Gothic styles. Groin vaults, rounded arches, paired windows, horizontal courses and other such features continued in use from the 11th century to the early 15th century. Often, in secular architecture, only the shape of the heads of windows indicate a late 13th- or 14th-century date rather than 12th or early 13th century. Many of Italy's finest Romanesque buildings, such as the Palazzo della Ragione, Mantua (begun 1250), were constructed many years after the Gothic style was already well established.

The open ground-floor loggia that is found in some Romanesque town houses also occurs in Italy at a number of buildings that served civic or communal purposes. In the cities of Mantua, Milan and Padua the Palazzo della Ragione ("place of reason") and in Como and Pavia the Broletto served as a town hall and centre of local government. These buildings spread their vast facades across large city squares which contrasted with the cramped medieval living quarters of most townsfolk. The loggia provided a covered communal space, and at Padua has been extended to form the city's major market. The Palazzo in Milan, also known as the Broletto Nuovo, ("New Court House") is a red brick structure with stone piers and rendered upper floor. It window arches are polychrome in the Italian style. The Broletto in Como is faced with polychrome marble.

The Tuscan hill town of Massa Marittima has two Romanesque civic buildings which typify the character of medieval architecture of Tuscany as against that found in the north. The Palazzo del Podestà and Palazzo del Comune of Massa Marittima represent a type of Romanesque civic building that continued in the Gothic style in other hill towns such as Volterra and reached its grandest expression in late the 13th-century Bargello and early 14th-century Palazzo Vecchio of Florence, and the Palazzo Pubblico of Siena.

Civic buildings of Italy

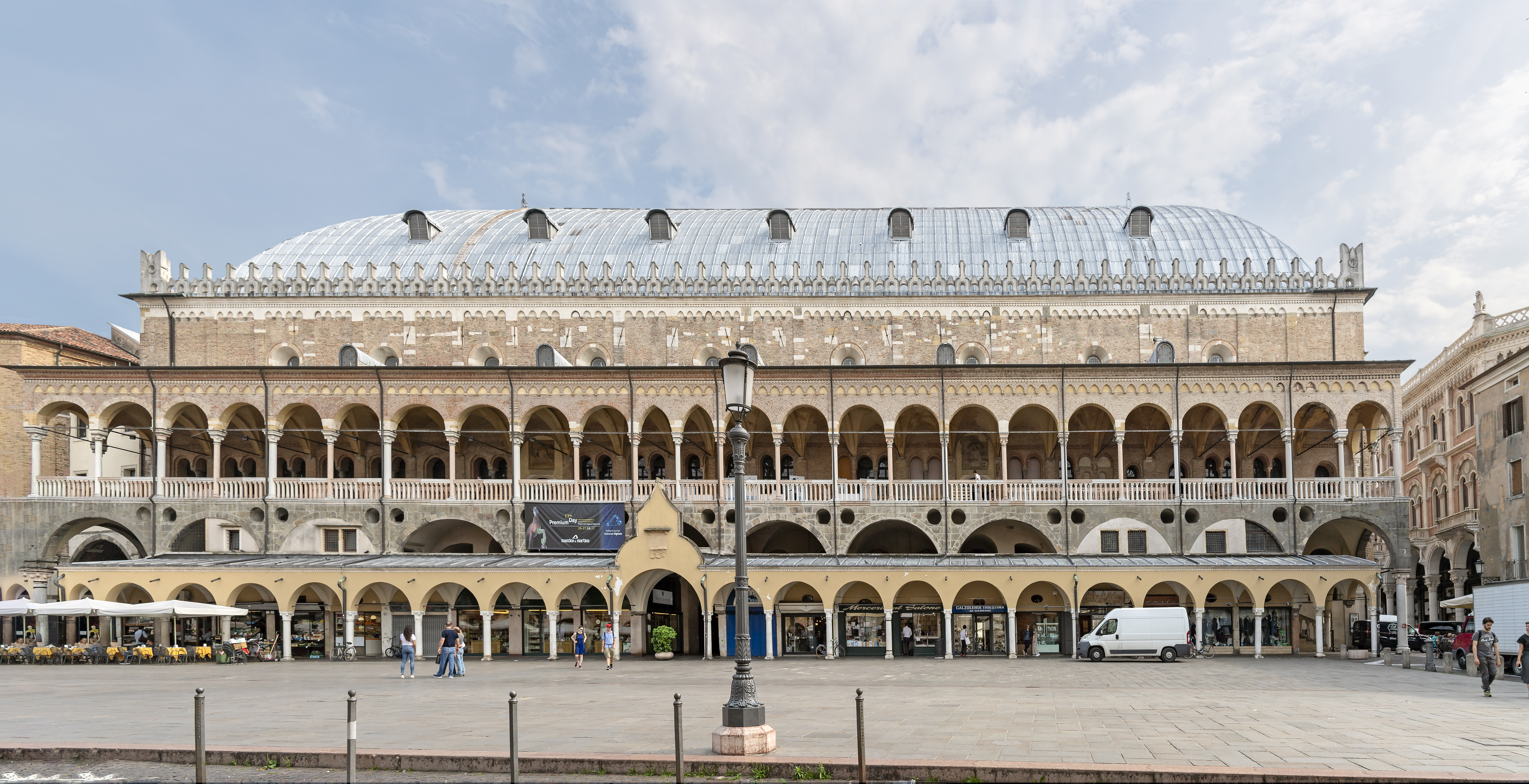
The Palazzo della Ragione, Padua, (1172–1219)

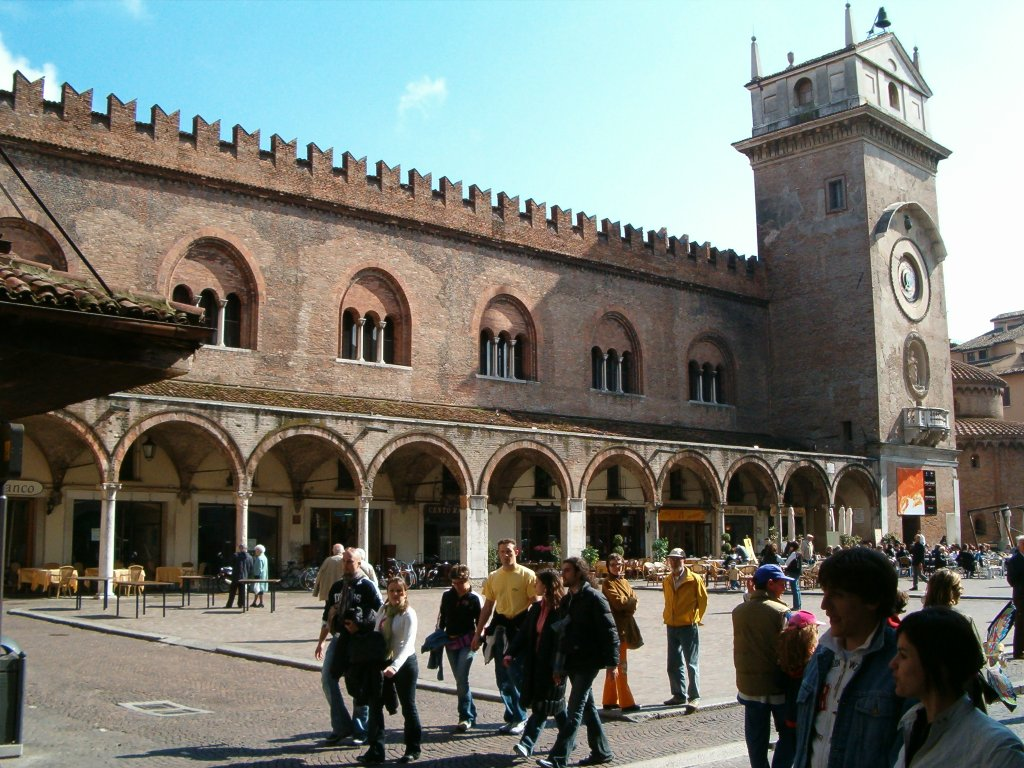
The Palazzo della Ragione, Mantua, (1250), has battlements that proclaim the city's political affinities.

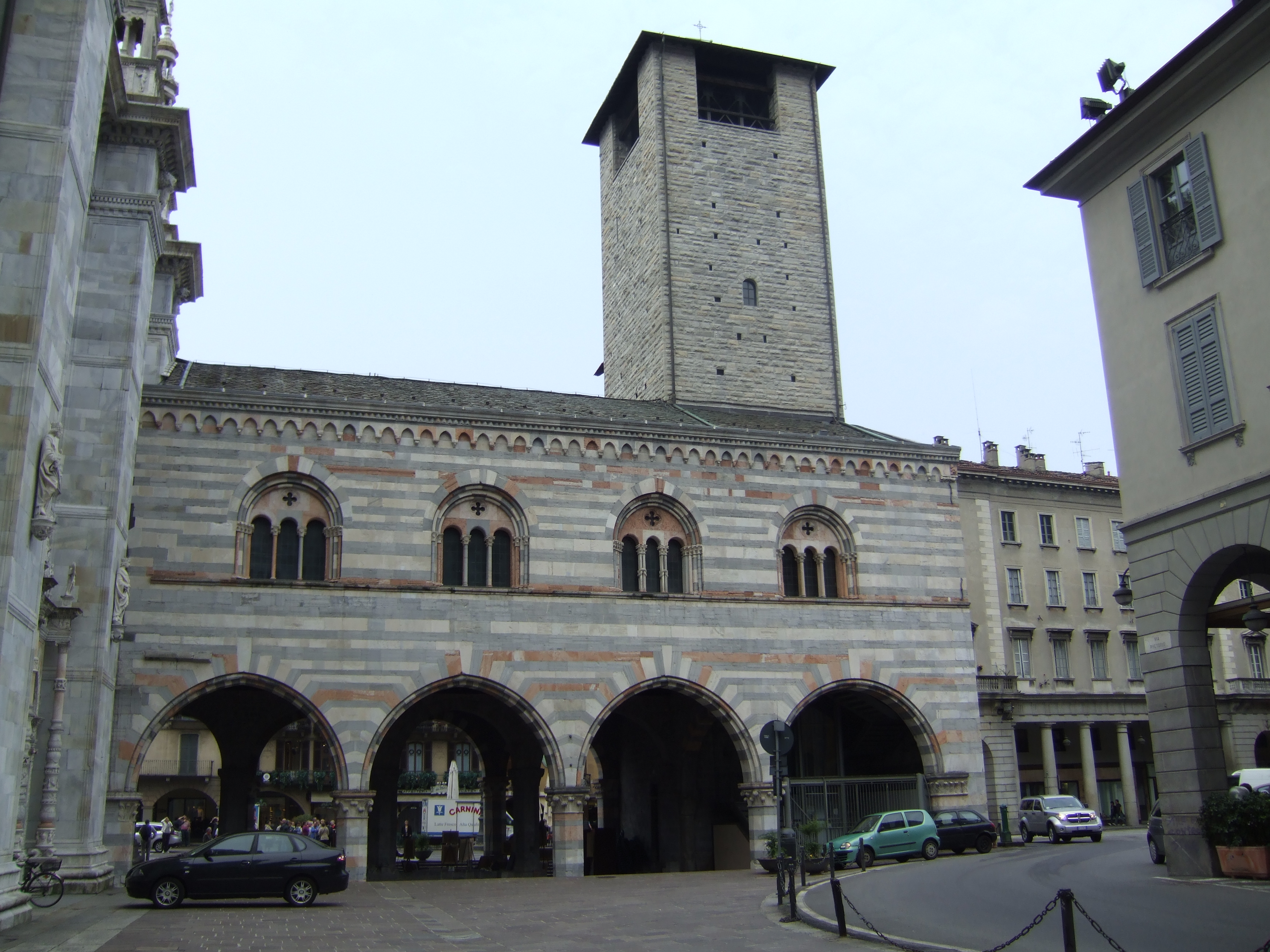
The polychrome marble facade of the Broletto, Como.

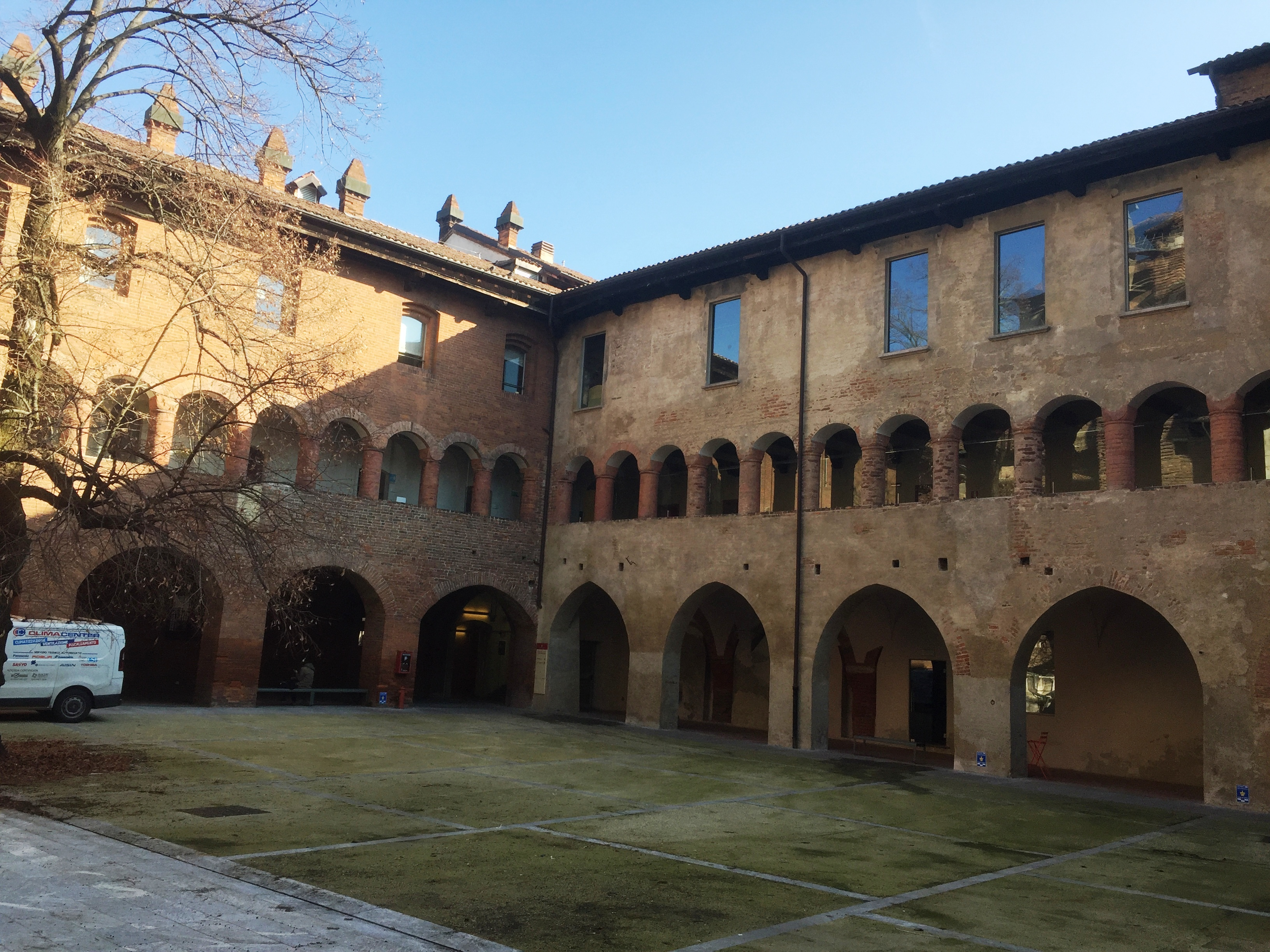
The courtyard of the broletto of Pavia.

== Romanesque revival ==
During the 19th century, when Gothic Revival architecture was fashionable, buildings were occasionally designed in the Romanesque style. There are a number of Romanesque Revival churches, dating from as early as the 1830s and continuing into the 20th century where the massive and "brutal" quality of the Romanesque style was appreciated and designed in brick. The Natural History Museum, London designed by Alfred Waterhouse, 1879, on the other hand, is a Romanesque revival building which makes full use of the decorative potential of Romanesque arcading and architectural sculpture. The Romanesque appearance has been achieved while freely adapting an overall style to suit the function of the building. The columns of the foyer, for example, give an impression of incised geometric design similar to those of Durham Cathedral. However, the sources of the incised patterns are the trunks of palms, cycads and tropical tree ferns. The animal motifs, of which there are many, include rare and exotic species.

The type of modern buildings for which the Romanesque style was most frequently adapted was the warehouse, where a lack of large windows and an appearance of great strength and stability were desirable features. These buildings, generally of brick, frequently have flattened buttresses rising to wide arches at the upper levels after the manner of some Italian Romanesque facades. This style was adapted to suit commercial buildings by opening the spaces between the arches into large windows, the brick walls becoming a shell to a building that was essentially of modern steel-frame construction, the architect Henry Hobson Richardson giving his name to the style, Richardsonian Romanesque. Good examples of the style are Marshall Fields store, Chicago by H.H.Richardson, 1885, and the Chadwick Lead Works in Boston, USA by William Preston, 1887. The style also lent itself to the building of cloth mills, steelworks and powerstations.

Romanesque Revival buildings

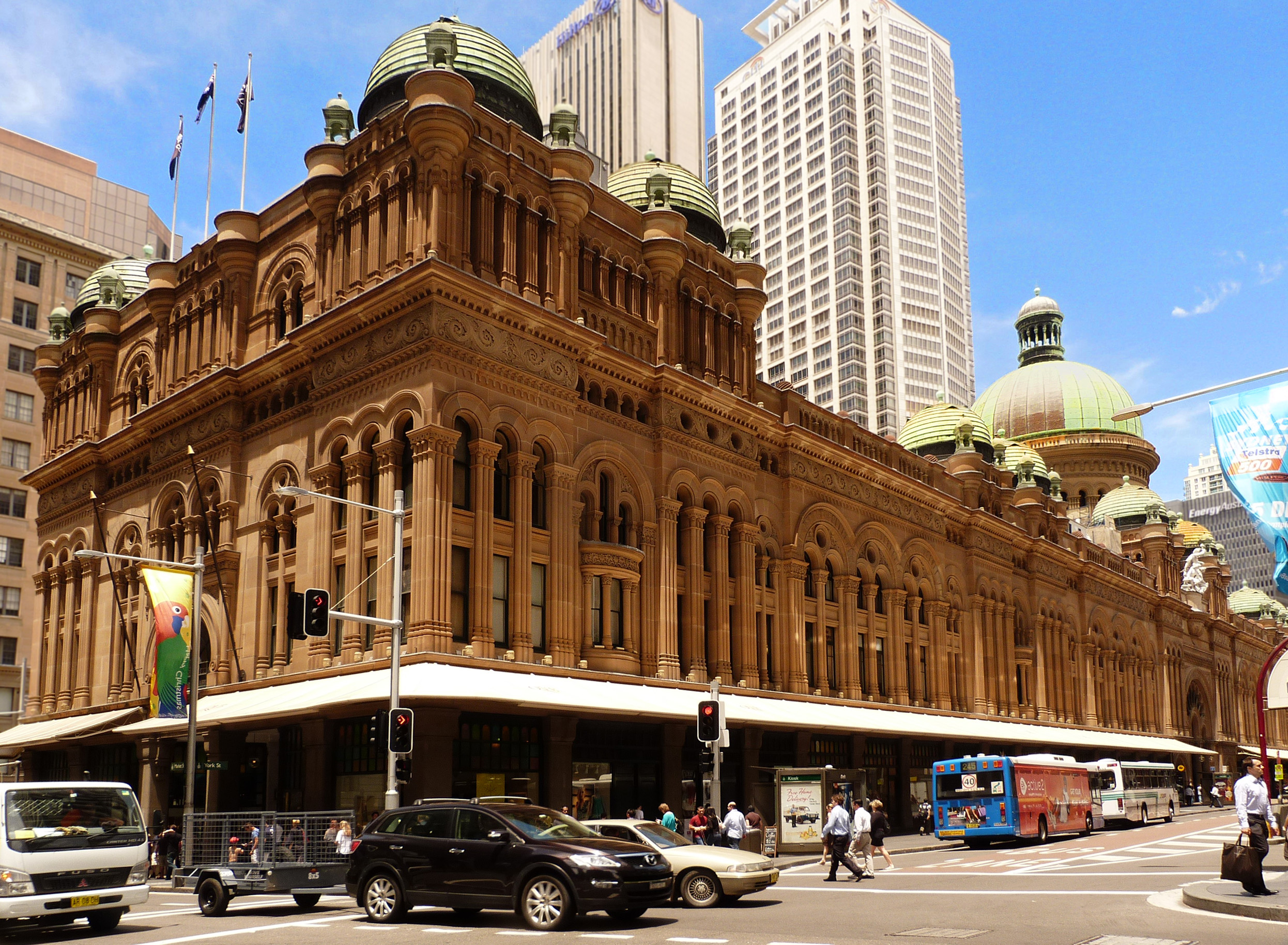
The Queen Victoria Building, Sydney, Australia, architect George McRae.

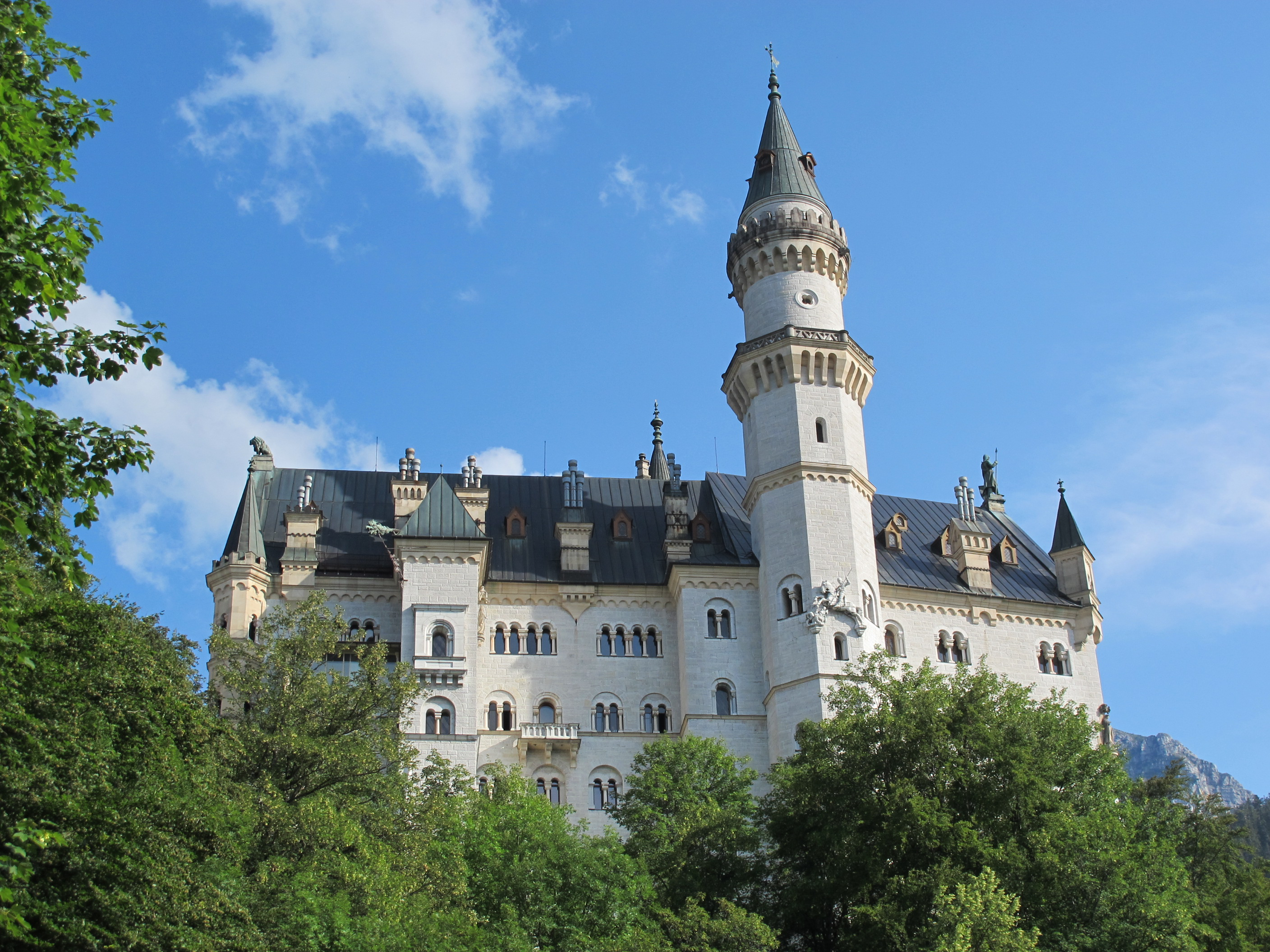
Neuschwanstein Castle at Hohenschwangau, Germany.

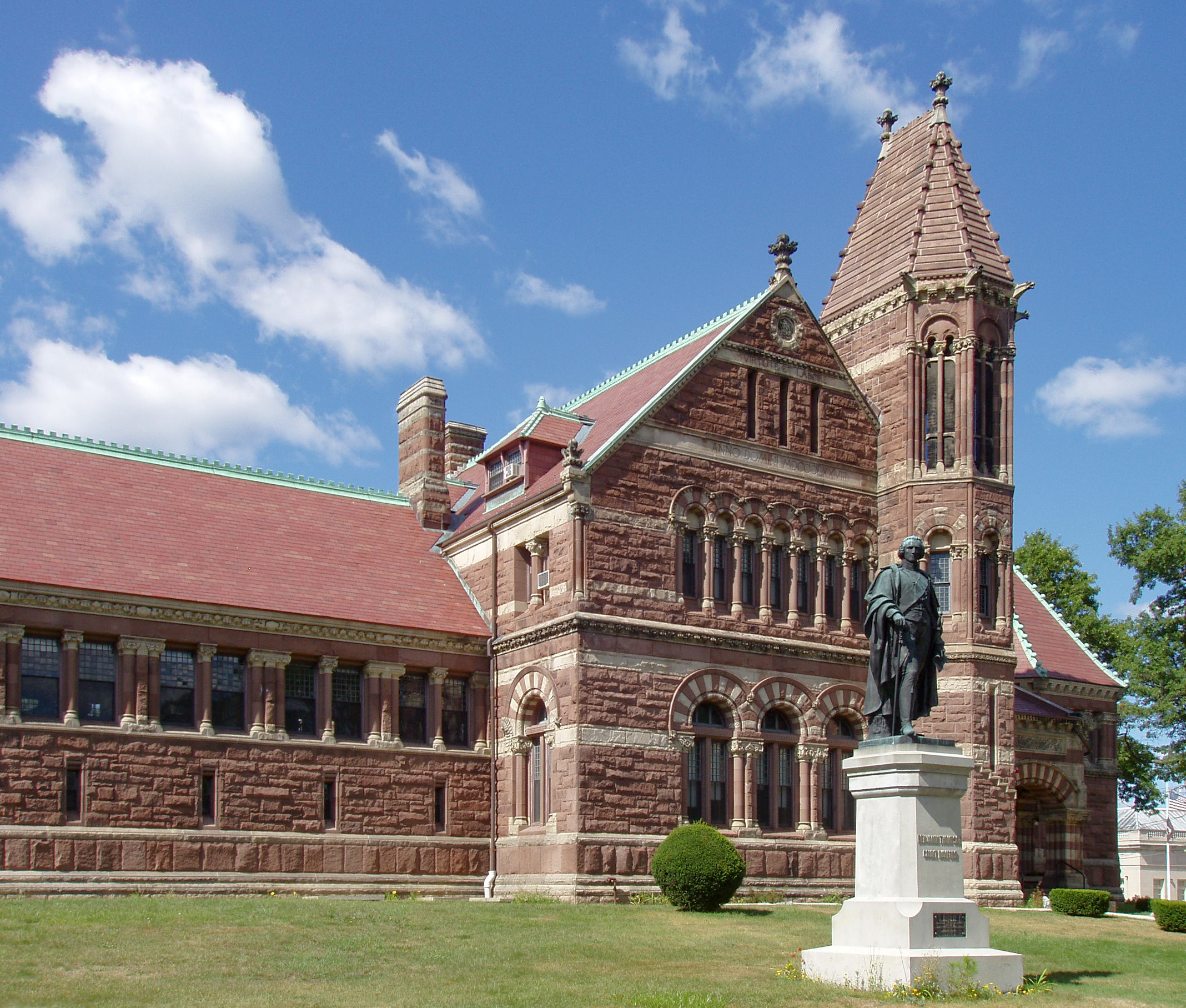
The Library, Woburn, Massachusetts.

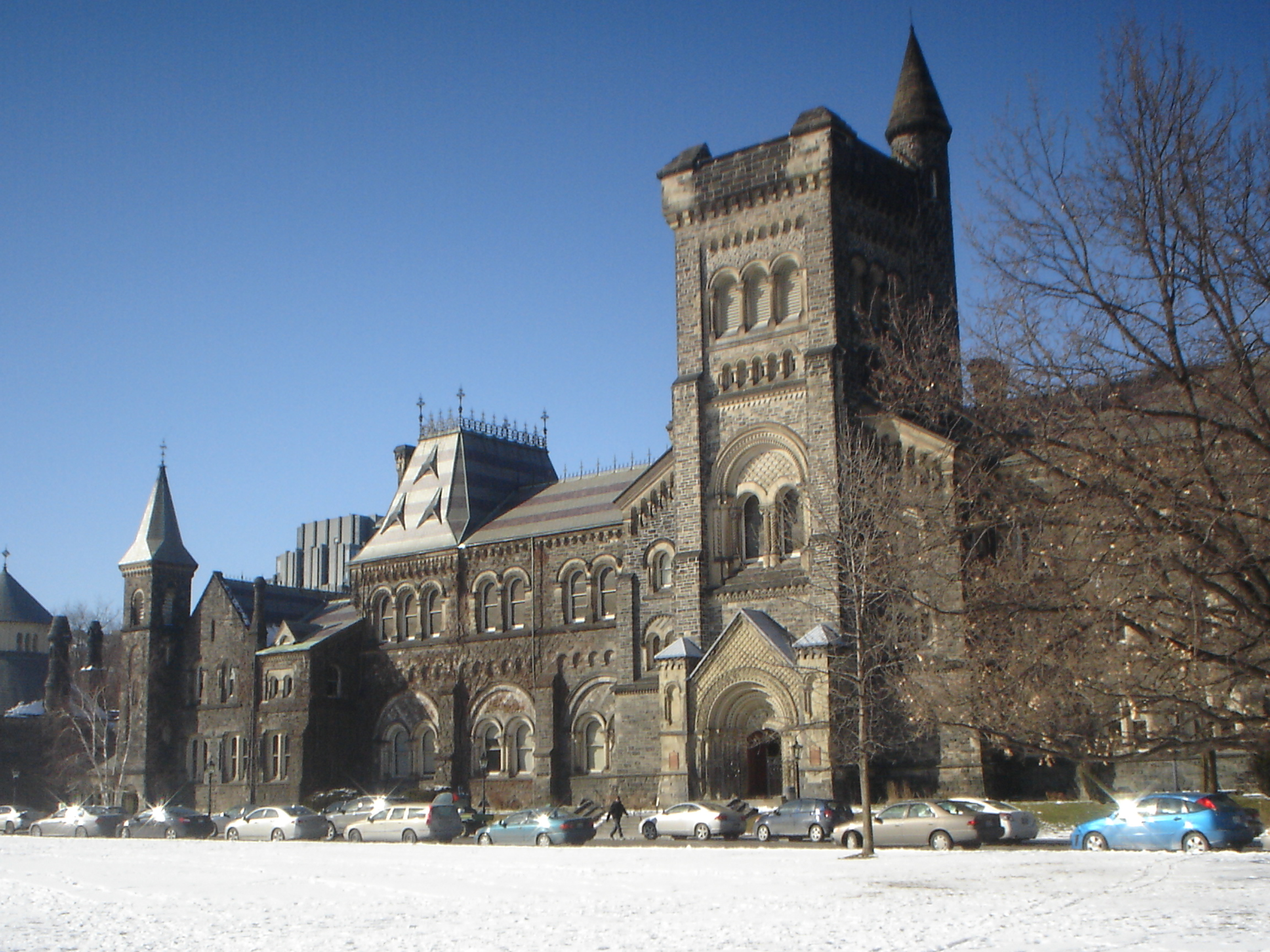
University College, Toronto.

== Notes and references ==
=== Bibliography ===
- V.I. Atroshenko and Judith Collins, The Origins of the Romanesque, Lund Humphries, London, 1985, ISBN 0-85331-487-X
- John Beckwith, Early Medieval Art, Thames and Hudson, (1964)
- R. Allen Brown, Castles: A History and Guide, New Orchard Editions, (1985) ISBN 1-85079-013-2
- Trewin Copplestone, World Architecture, an Illustrated History, Paul Hamlyn, (1963)
- F. H. Crossley, revised, Brian Little, The English Abbey, Batsford, London, (1962)
- Dodwell, C.R.; The Pictorial arts of the West, 800–1200, 1993, Yale UP, ISBN 0300064934
- Banister Fletcher, A History of Architecture on the Comparative method (2001). Elsevier Science & Technology. ISBN 0-7506-2267-9.
- Helen Gardner; Fred S. Kleiner, Christin J. Mamiya, Gardner's Art through the Ages. Thomson Wadsworth, (2004) ISBN 0-15-505090-7.
- George Holmes, editor, The Oxford Illustrated History of Medieval Europe, Oxford University Press, (1992) ISBN 0-19-820073-0
- René Huyghe, Larousse Encyclopedia of Byzantine and Medieval Art, Paul Hamlyn, (1958)
- Paul Johnson, The National Trust Book of British Castles, Weidenfeld & Nicolson, (1978) ISBN 0-297-77439-5
- Marion Kaminski, Art and Architecture of Venice, Könemann, (1999) ISBN 3-8290-2667-6
- Peter Kidson, The Medieval World, Paul Hamlyn, (1967)
- Marian Moffett, Michael Fazio, Lawrence Wodehouse, A World History of Architecture, Lawrence King Publishing, (2003), ISBN 1-85669-353-8.
- Nikolaus Pevsner, An Outline of European Architecture. Pelican Books (1964)
- Rolf Toman, Romanesque: Architecture, Sculpture, Painting, Könemann, (1997), ISBN 3-89508-447-6
- Rosella Vantaggi, San Gimignano, Town of fine Towers, Plurigraf, (1979)

== See also ==
- List of Romanesque architecture
- Regional characteristics of Romanesque architecture
- Romanesque art
- Romanesque sculpture
- Renaissance of the 12th century
- Romanesque Revival architecture
- Medieval architecture
- Pre-Romanesque art and architecture
- Ottonian architecture
- Romano-Gothic architecture
- Gothic architecture
- Castle
