= Palazzo Comunale, San Gimignano =

Palazzo Comunale
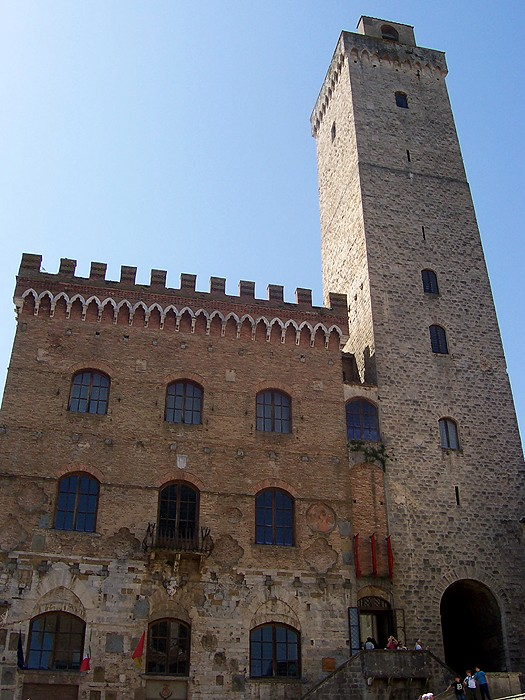
- Interactive map of the Palazzo Comunale area
- Alternative names: Palazzo del Popolo

General information
- Location: Piazza del Duomo, San Gimignano, Tuscany, Italy
- Coordinates: 43.467869°N 11.042923°E
- Completed: 13th Century

Height
- Height: 54 meters

The Palazzo Comunale (Italian: Municipal palace), also known as the Palazzo del Popolo (Italian: People's palace) of San Gimignano has been the seat of the civic authority in the comune since the 13th century. It is located on the Piazza del Duomo close to the Collegiate Church of the Assumption of the Blessed Virgin Mary. The building and Collegiate Church are at the heart of the medieval town, and are part of the UNESCO World Heritage Site of the "Historic Centre of San Gimignano".

The building contains important fresco decorations by Memmo di Filippuccio, Lippo Memmi and others, a museum and a gallery with works of the Florentine and Sienese schools of art - including paintings by Coppo di Marcovaldo, Lippo Memmi, Benozzo Gozzoli, Filippino Lippi, Il Sodoma and Pinturicchio.

== History and architecture ==
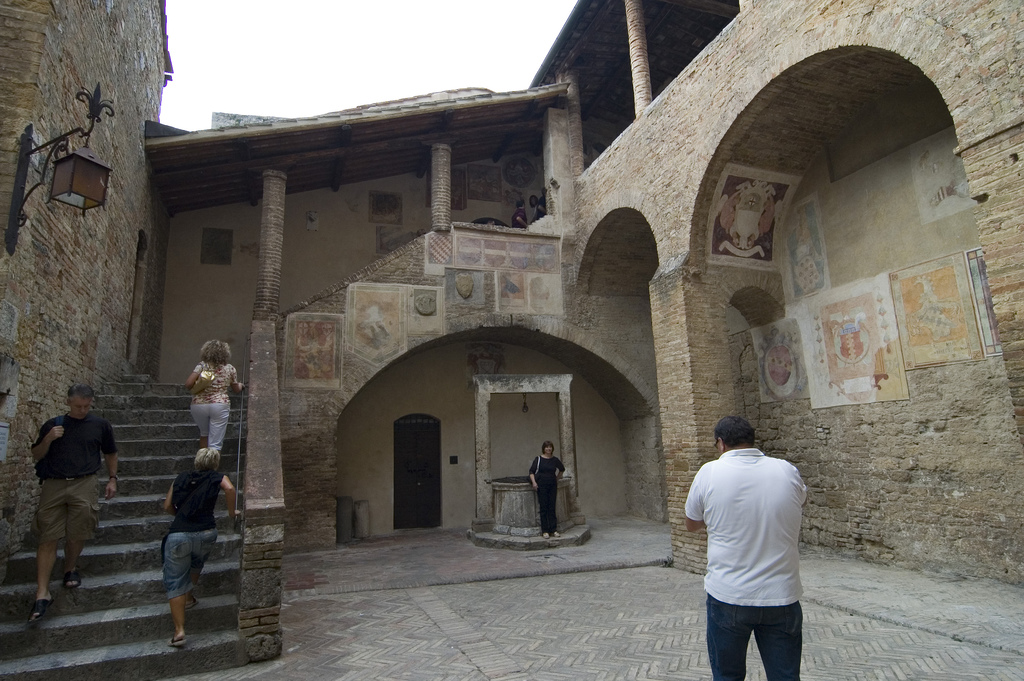
Palazzo courtyard

The Palazzo Comunale dates from the late 13th century, and was built on the ruins of an existing building between 1289 and 1298. Further expanded in the 14th century, the facade is characterised by arched windows, with the lower half of the frontage built with stone, and the upper part in brick.

On the ground floor is a courtyard, which was built in 1323 and is decorated with the coats of arms of those who have held public office in the municipality. The main civic offices of the town council are now located on this ground floor.

On the first floor is a stepped gallery from which dignitaries would address the gathered crowd in the square. The battlements date from a restoration of the nineteenth century, and the structure is capped by the "Torre Grossa” (great tower). This tower was completed in 1300 and (at 54 meters) is the highest tower in the walled town.

== Museum ==
The Palazzo Comunale, seat of the government of San Gimignano, was built in 1288. Enlarged in 1323, the palace became the seat of the town after it had taken place in the nearby Palazzo Vecchio del Podestà, from 1337. The building houses the civic museum since 1852. The crenellated crown and other elements date back to the restoration carried out by Giuseppe Partini between 1878 and 1881.

The Civic Museum of San Gimignano is located on the upper floors of the building and can be accessed both from the Piazza del Duomo and from the courtyard behind the Palace. The courtyard was built in 1323 and is decorated with frescoes or sculpted coats of arms and, in the center, a cistern arranged in 1361. Among the frescoes is a Sant'Ivo that makes justice of Sodom, a Madonna with two saints by an unidentified Sienese painter of the second half of the fourteenth century, and a Justice that tramples on the lie monochrome of Vincenzo Tamagni (sixteenth century). From here starts the external staircase for the entrance to the premises of the museum, covered by a canopy supported by brick columns.

=== Hall ===
The "Sala del Consiglio" is a large reception hall which was used as the council chamber. It is commonly known as the "Sala di Dante" and is named for the noted poet Dante Alighieri who visited San Gimignano in 1300 as an ambassador of the Florentine Republic. He pleaded before the mayor and the general council the cause of a Tuscan Guelph league.

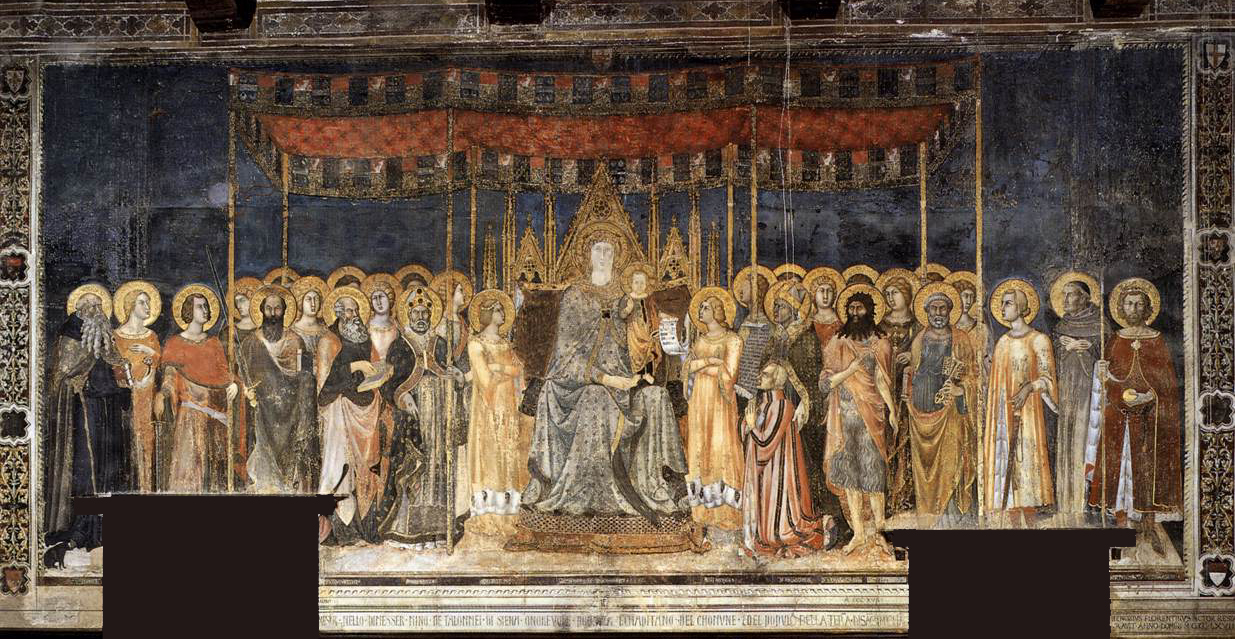
Lippo Memmi's Maestà in the Sala di Dante

The room is decorated with a Maestà by Lippo Memmi. Commissioned in 1317 by Nello de Mino Tolomei (then podestà of San Gimignano), the fresco is believed to have been inspired by the one painted by his brother-in-law Simone Martini's Maestà from the Palazzo Pubblico in Siena. The fresco shows Mary seated on a throne surrounded by adoring saints and angels (including patron Nello de Mino Tolomei).

Just off the great hall is a meeting room which was originally used for private meetings.

The next room was used by the city government. It contains the ancient carved and inlaid wooden seats (1475) and a bust of San Bartolo in coloured terracotta of the first half of the fifteenth century within a niche. On this floor, there is another small room with a bust of Guido Marabottini, in Florentine terracotta of the fifteenth century. From here also starts the staircase for the climb to the Torre Grossa. The actual art gallery is located on the second floor.

=== Gallery ===
The gallery itself is on the second floor and contains works by Coppo di Marcovaldo, Lippo Memmi, Benozzo Gozzoli, Filippino Lippi, Il Sodoma, Pinturicchio, Azzo di Masetto, Niccolò di Ser Sozzo; Taddeo di Bartolo, Lorenzo di Niccolò, the so-called Master of 1419, and Benedetto da Maiano.

The first room is called The Trinity, due to a painting on this topic (1497) by Pier Francesco Fiorentino. It also houses a Madonna and Child with Saints by Leonardo da Pistoia and a Pietà by Bastiano Mainardi.

Other rooms contain a Maestà from the late thirteenth century, altar decorations by Memmo di Filippuccio, a Madonna and Child by Vincenzo Tamagni (1528), several Gothic altarpieces (including one showing scenes from the life of Saint Gimignano), a Madonna with Saints Gregory and Benedict by Pinturicchio, and two medieval crucifixes of the Florentine school.

The Podestà apartments (Camera del Podestà) are frescoed with matrimonial scenes of a couple taking a bath and going to bed. (An unusual work by Memmo di Filippuccio dated to the early 14th century.)
