= Torre Rognosa =

Tower in San Gimignano, Italy

Coordinates: 43°28′04″N 11°02′36″E

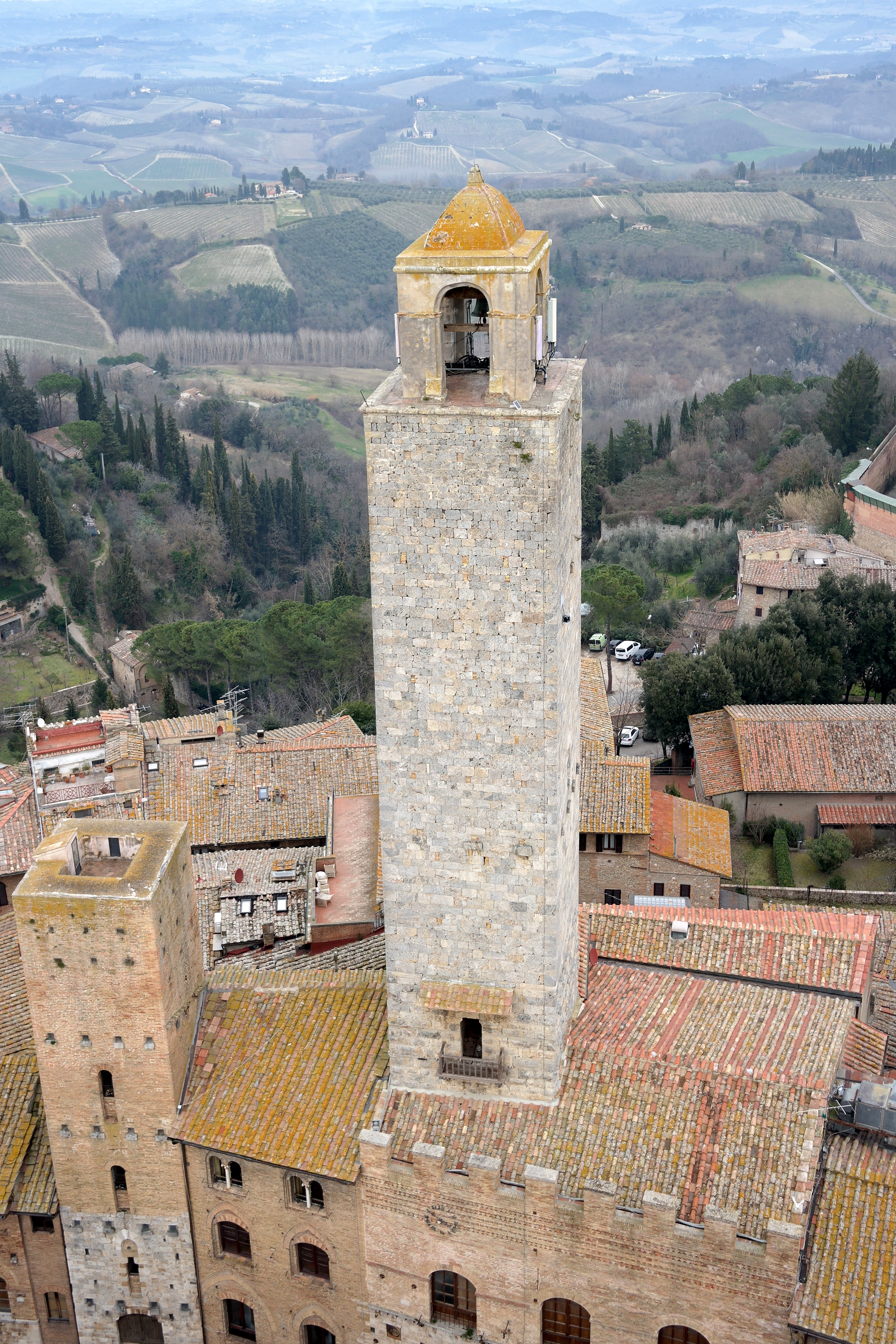
Torre Rognosa

Torre Rognosa is a 51-metre (167 ft) tower located in San Gimignano, built in the 13th century and owned by Gregori family first and then the Oti family. It is one of the best-preserved towers in the town and the second-tallest tower (the tallest is Torre Grossa).

It is located over the Palazzo del Podestà and Piazza del Duomo, alongside the Palazzo Chigi.
