= Piazza del Duomo, San Gimignano =

Piazza in San Gimignano, Italy

Coordinates: 43°28′4.03″N 11°2′35.32″E

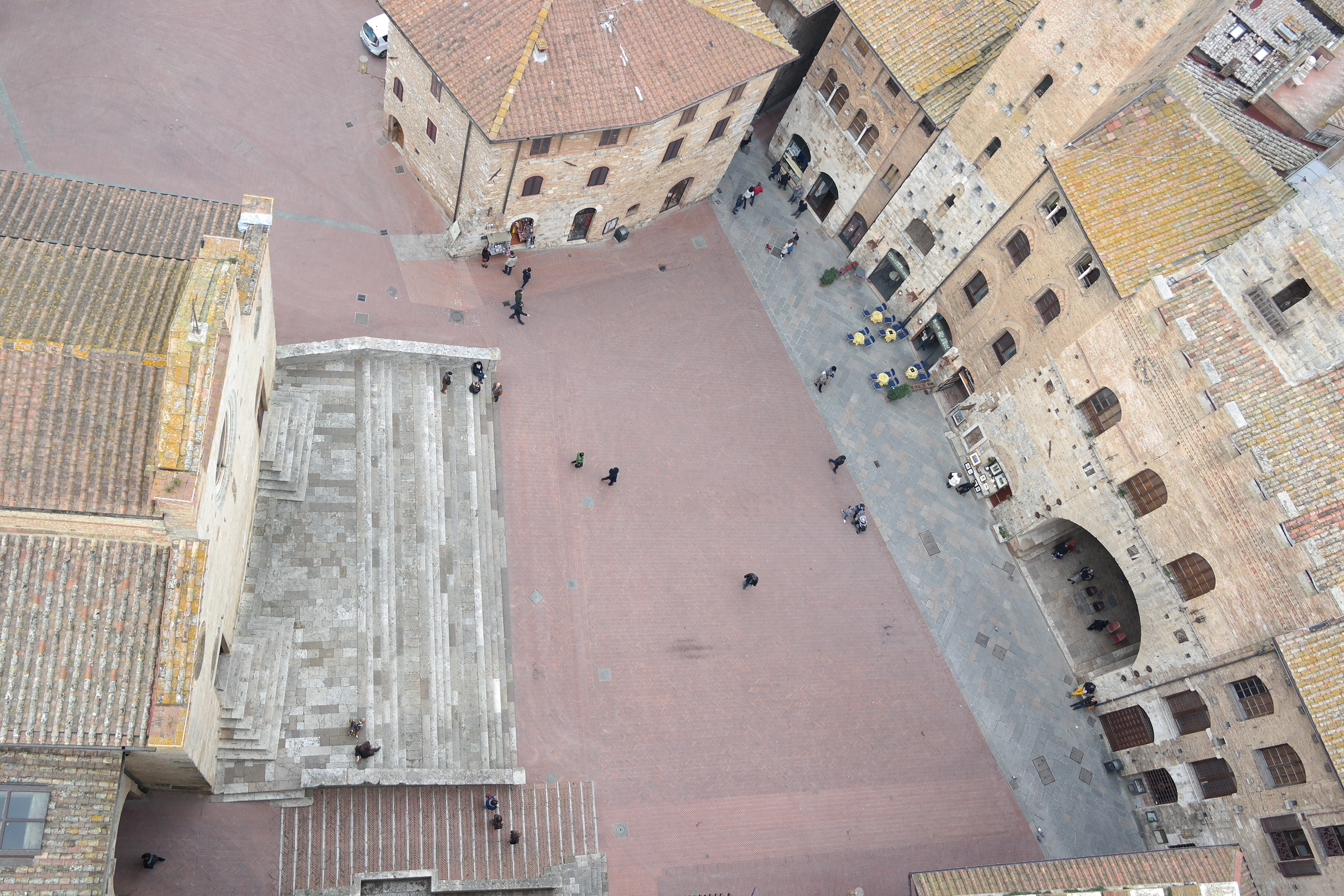
Piazza del Duomo

Piazza del Duomo is a city square in San Gimignano, Italy. It is connected to the nearby Piazza della Cisterna.

== Buildings around the square ==
- Palazzo vecchio del Podestà
- Torre Rognosa
- Torre Chigi
- Torri dei Salvucci
- Palazzo Comunale, San Gimignano
- Loggia del Comune
- Torre Grossa
