= Torre del Diavolo =

Tower in San Gimignano, Italy

Coordinates: 43°28′03″N 11°02′38″E

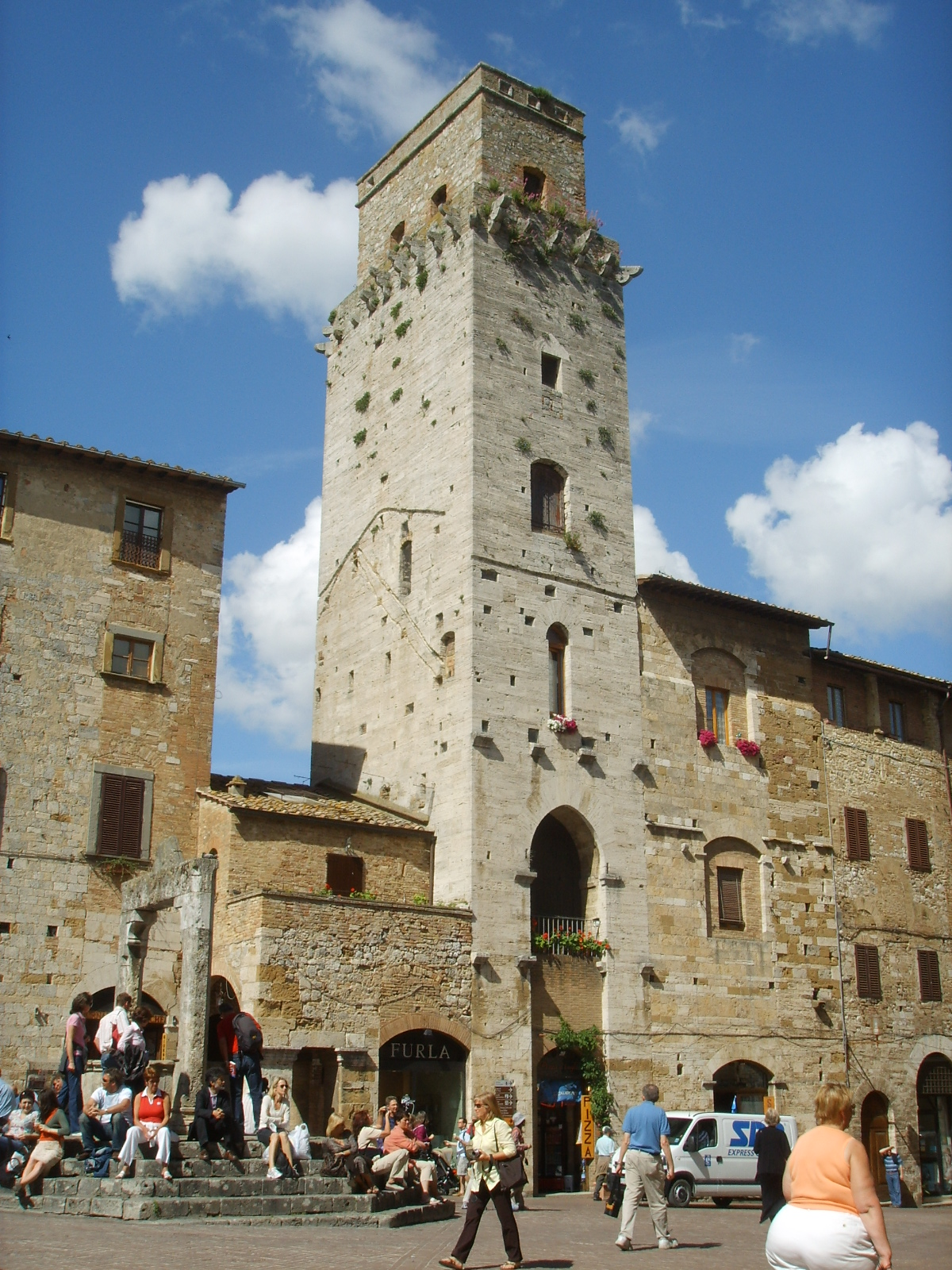
Devil's Tower in Piazza della Cisterna.

Devil's Tower (Italian: Torre del Diavolo) is a tower located in the north of San Gimignano, Tuscany, Italy, which flanks the Palazzo Cortesi. It is named "Devil's Tower" because of a legend in which the owner of the tower at the time returned home after a long journey, and "[was] convinced that it had grown taller, the only explanation for the phenomenon, he alleged, being that a DIY-inclined devil had been busy during his absence". It is made of white calciferous rock, possessing brackets on the top of the latter portion.

The tower houses the (Italian: Museo della Tortura), which provides scientific presentation of this subject matter.
