= Ulignano =

- Frazione
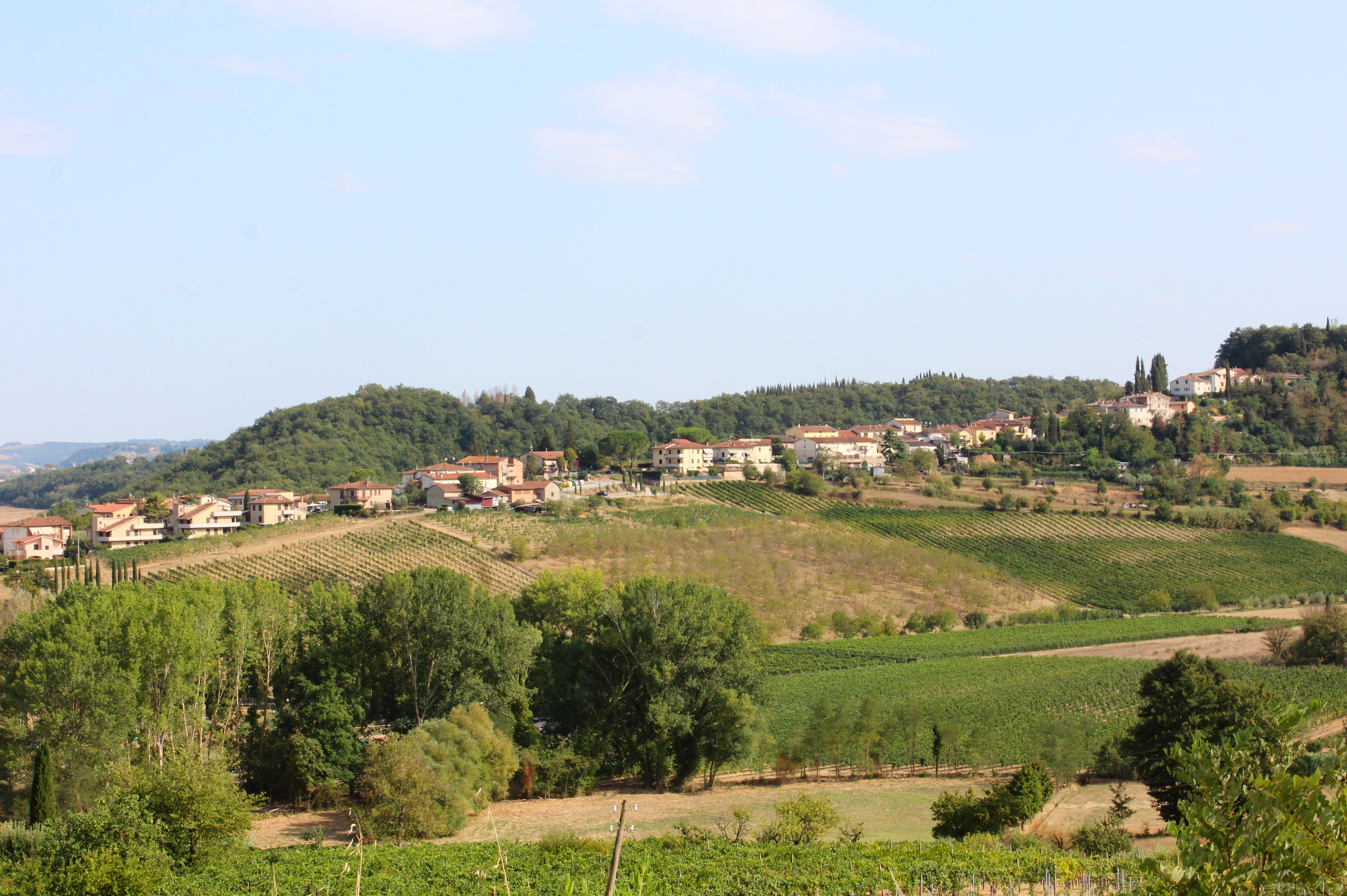
- View of Ulignano

- Location of Ulignano in Italy
- Coordinates: 43°30′19″N 11°4′53″E
- Country: Italy
- Region: Tuscany
- Province: Siena (SI)
- Comune: San Gimignano
- Elevation: 168 m (551 ft)

Population (2011)
  - Total: 506
- Demonym: Ulignanesi
- Time zone: UTC+1 (CET)
  - Summer (DST): UTC+2 (CEST)

Ulignano is a village in Tuscany, central Italy, administratively a frazione of the comune of San Gimignano, province of Siena. At the time of the 2001 census its population was 688.

Ulignano is about 40 km from Siena and 8 km from San Gimignano.
