= San Donato, San Gimignano =

San Donato
- Frazione
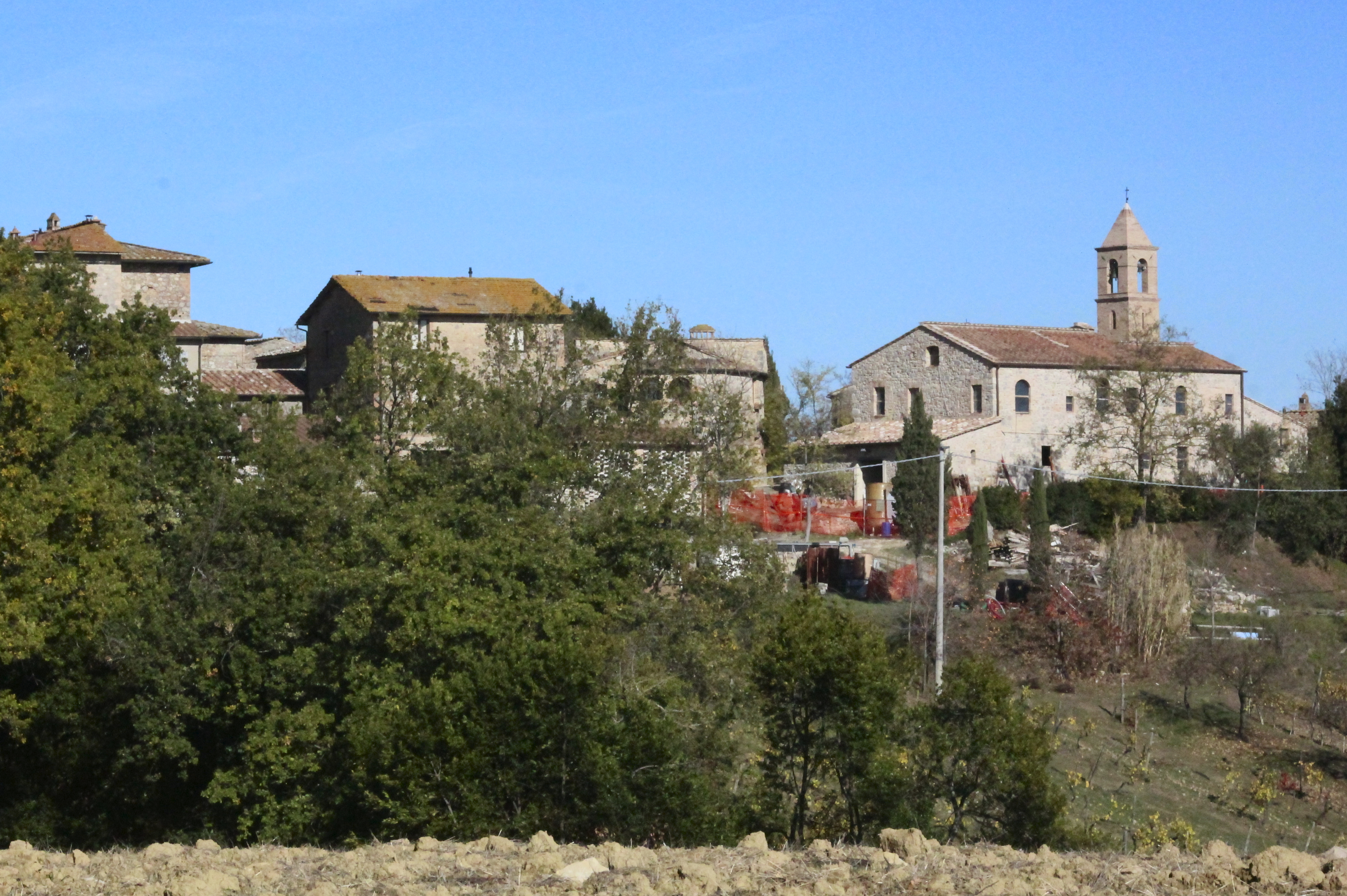

- Location of San Donato in Italy
- Coordinates: 43°26′26″N 11°1′5″E
- Country: Italy
- Region: Tuscany
- Province: Siena (SI)
- Comune: San Gimignano
- Elevation: 357 m (1,171 ft)

Population (2011)
  - Total: 22
- Time zone: UTC+1 (CET)
  - Summer (DST): UTC+2 (CEST)

San Donato is a village in Tuscany, central Italy, administratively a frazione of the comune of San Gimignano, province of Siena. At the time of the 2001 census its population was 18.

San Donato is about 45 km from Siena and 7 km from San Gimignano.
