= Niccolò di Ser Sozzo =

Italian painter

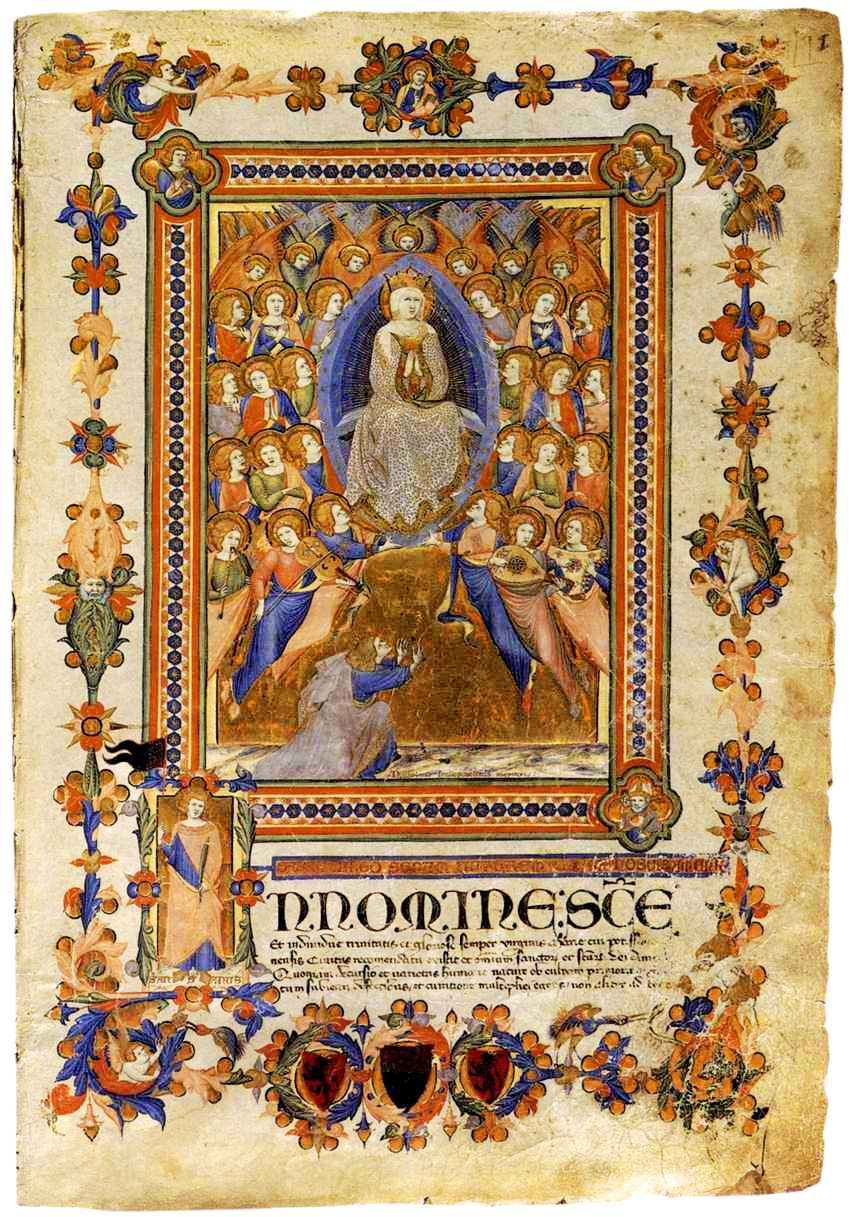
Assumption of the Virgin, frontispiece to Codex Caleffo (c.1334) Archivio di Stato at Siena

Niccolò di Ser Sozzo (fl. 1334–63) was an Italian painter and manuscript illuminator. He generally has been identified as Niccolò di Ser Sozzo di Francesco Tegliacci, but recent research points instead to a Niccolò di Ser Sozzo di Stefano. Whatever his true identity, Niccolo was one of the leading panel painters and miniaturists at work in Siena in the mid-14th century. His style is closest to that of Lippo Vanni and his sometime collaborator Luca di Tomme and is ultimately dependent upon the tradition of Simone Martini and, especially, the Lorenzetti brothers, in whose workshop he may have apprenticed.

His most celebrated and earliest documented work is an elaborate Assumption of the Virgin forming the frontispiece to the Sienese land and property registration book known as the Codex Caleffo (c. 1334), now found in the Archivio di Stato at Siena. This work is inscribed in Latin "Nicholaus, Ser Sozzi de Senis me pinxit" (Niccolo di Sozzo of Siena painted me). Among the several paintings attributed to his hand is a dismembered polyptych in the Pinacoteca Civica of San Gimignano, formerly in the nearby church of Monteoliveto, also featuring an "Assumption". Also near to San Gimignano in the town of Poggibonsi, the church of San Antonio once held a "Virgin and Child" that is now in the Uffizi Gallery in Florence and a "Madonna and Child with Two Angels and Two Saints" is in Siena's Pinacoteca. The Getty Museum in Los Angeles possesses a fragment of one of his largest works, depicting "Virgin and Child with Two Angels". Another of Niccolò's panels representing the Virgin and Child against a cloth of honor is in a private Milanese collection.

Niccolò is best known, however, as a miniaturist. In addition to his "Assumption" from the "Callefo" in the Siena Archives, that city's library contains an antiphonary with four illuminations by Niccolò (Virgin and Child, Presentation, Baptism, Resurrection of the Dead). The Museo di Arte Sacra in San Gimignano preserves a choirbook (Graduale LXVIII) with a number of historiated initials attributed to Niccolò (Adoration the Magi, Presentation Pentecost, Trinity, Assumption of the Virgin, San Gimignano adored by five monks, San Gimignano Enthroned). The Cini Foundation in Venice has a fine cutting with the Annunciation.

Miniatures by Niccolò di Ser Sozzo are to be found in American collections as well. Among these are an initial on an antiphonary page in the Newark Museum showing yet another Assumption, a cutting from a choirbook depicting two female saints in the Cleveland Museum of Art, an Ascension in the Initial V excised from an antiphonary now in New York's Metropolitan Museum, a Resurrection on a gradual page (Plimpton MS040F) in Columbia University's Rare Book and Manuscript Library, eleven initials (four historiated and seven flourished) on the pages of an antiphonal from the Joline Collection now in the Barnard College Library of Columbia University. The four historiated Joline initials depict the Consecration of the Host, the "Stigmata of St. Francis Observed by Brother Leo", the Death of St. Francis, and St. Anthony holding a book. The Rare Book Department of the Free Library of Philadelphia has a cutting of the Trinity (Lewis EM 025:05) which it dates to 1345–50 and a page from a gradual with an initial with Christ as the Man of Sorrows (Lewis EM 069:09). A cutting with St. John the Baptist in the Michigan Museum of Art might also come from Niccolò's hand. Pages from a missal in Columbia, South Carolina, feature two historiated initials with the "Massacre of the Innocents" and an "Angel Appearing to St. Joseph".

== Sources ==
- C.Brandi,"Niccolo di ser Sozzo Tegliacci, L'Arte, 2, 1932, 222-36;
- M. Bicci, "Proposito per Niccolo di ser Sozzo," Paragone, 16, 1965, 51-60
- C. Benedictis, "Sull'attività giovanile di Niccolo Tegliacci," Paragone, 291, 1974, 51-61
- C. Benedictis, "Per il catalogo di Niccolo Tegliacci," Paragone, 311, 1974, 74-76.
- C. Benedictis, "I Corali di San Gimignano--Le miniature di Niccolo Tegliacci," Paragone, 313, 1976, 103–120.
- C. Benedictis, "I Corali di San Gimignano -- Il secondo miniatore," Paragone, 315, 1976, 87-95.
- C. Brandi, "Niccolo di Ser Sozzo Tegliacci," L'Arte, 35, 1932, 222-36.
- S. Fehm, The Collaboration of Niccolo Tegliacci and Luca di Tomme, Malibu 1973.
- W. Gerdts, "An Italian Fourteenth-Century Miniature at Newark," Art Quarterly, 19, 1956, 278-81.
- J. Herbert, Illuminated Manuscripts, London, 1911.
- W. Milliken, "An illuminated Miniature boy Niccolo di Ser Sozzo Tegliacci," Art in America and Elsewhere, 13, June 1925, 161-66.
- G. Moran & S. Fineschi, "Niccolo di Ser Sozzo: Tagliacci or di Stefano?," Paragone, 321, 1976, 58-63.
- P, Palladino, Treasures of a Lost Art: Italian Manuscript Pages of the Middle Ages and Renaissance, New Haven/London, 2003, 53-54.
- F. Zeri, "Sul problema di Niccolo di Ser Sozzo Tegliacci e Luca di Tomme," Paragone, p. 105, 1958, 3-16.
