= Santa Lucia, San Gimignano =

Santa Lucia
- Frazione
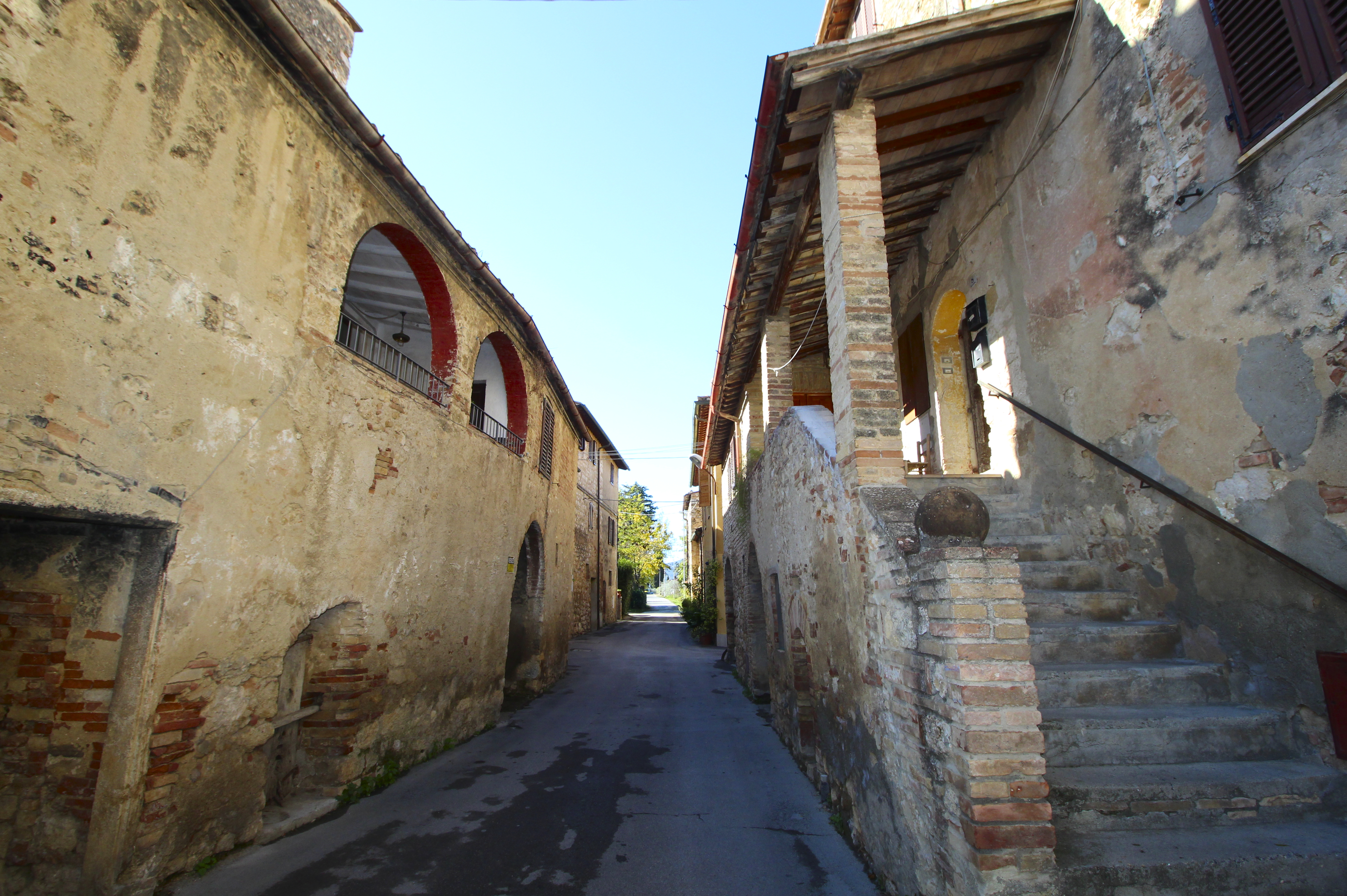

- Location of Santa Lucia in Italy
- Coordinates: 43°27′3″N 11°3′41″E
- Country: Italy
- Region: Tuscany
- Province: Siena (SI)
- Comune: San Gimignano
- Elevation: 268 m (879 ft)

Population (2011)
  - Total: 310
- Time zone: UTC+1 (CET)
  - Summer (DST): UTC+2 (CEST)

Santa Lucia is a village in Tuscany, central Italy, administratively a frazione of the comune of San Gimignano, province of Siena. At the time of the 2001 census its population was 289.

Santa Lucia is about 42 km from Siena and 4 km from San Gimignano.
