= Badia a Elmi =

- Frazione
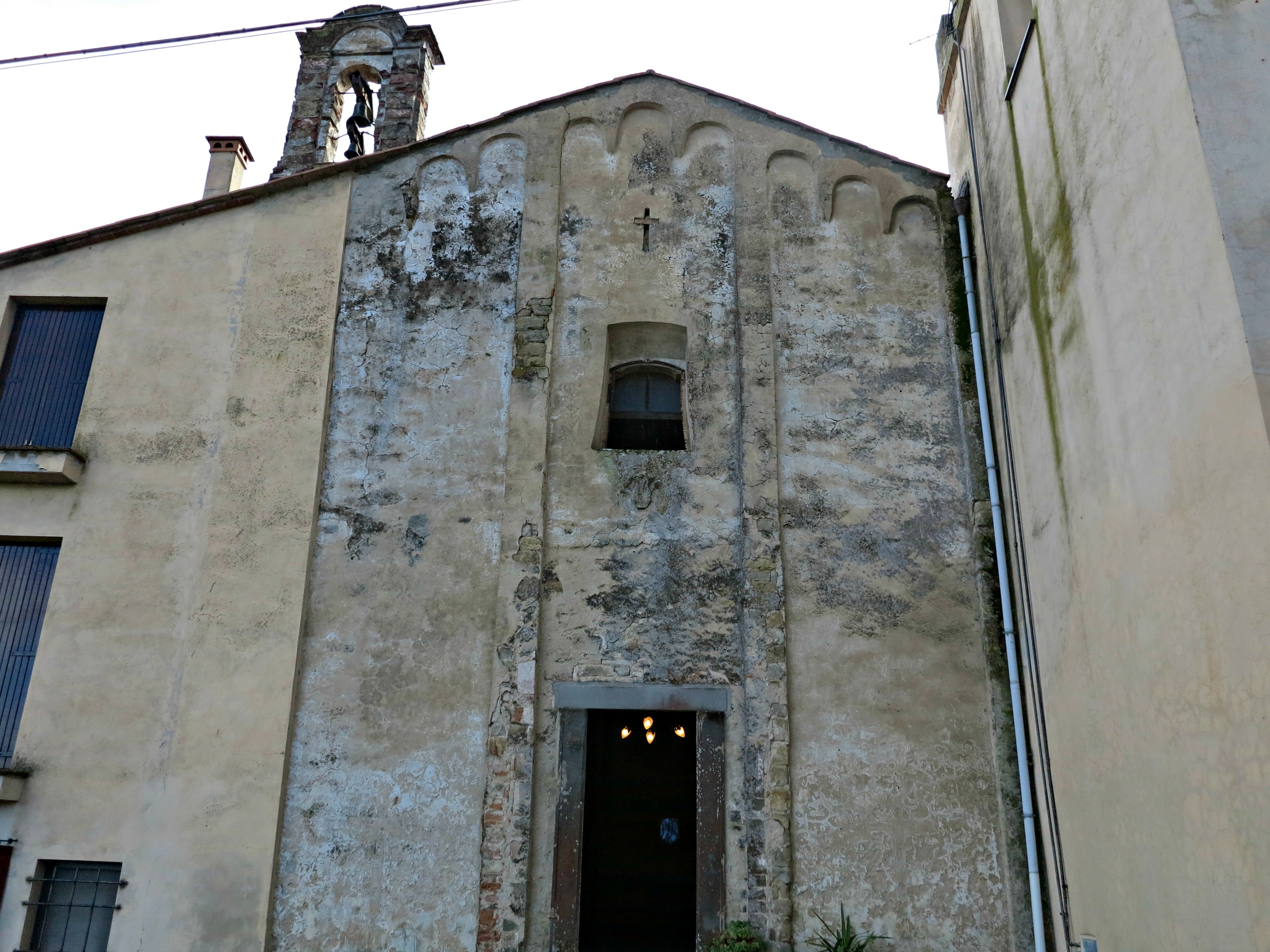
- The Abbey of Santa Maria a Elmi

- Location of Badia a Elmi in Italy
- Coordinates: 43°32′11″N 11°01′57″E
- Country: Italy
- Region: Tuscany
- Province: Siena (SI)
- Comune: San Gimignano
- Elevation: 94 m (308 ft)

Population (2011)
  - Total: 908
- Time zone: UTC+1 (CET)
  - Summer (DST): UTC+2 (CEST)

Badia a Elmi is a town in Tuscany, central Italy, administratively a frazione of the comune of San Gimignano, province of Siena. At the time of the 2001 census its population was 424.

Badia a Elmi is about 46 km from Siena and 12 km from San Gimignano.
