= Piazza della Cisterna =

Piazza in San Gimignano, Italy

Coordinates: 43°28′2.79″N 11°2′36.89″E

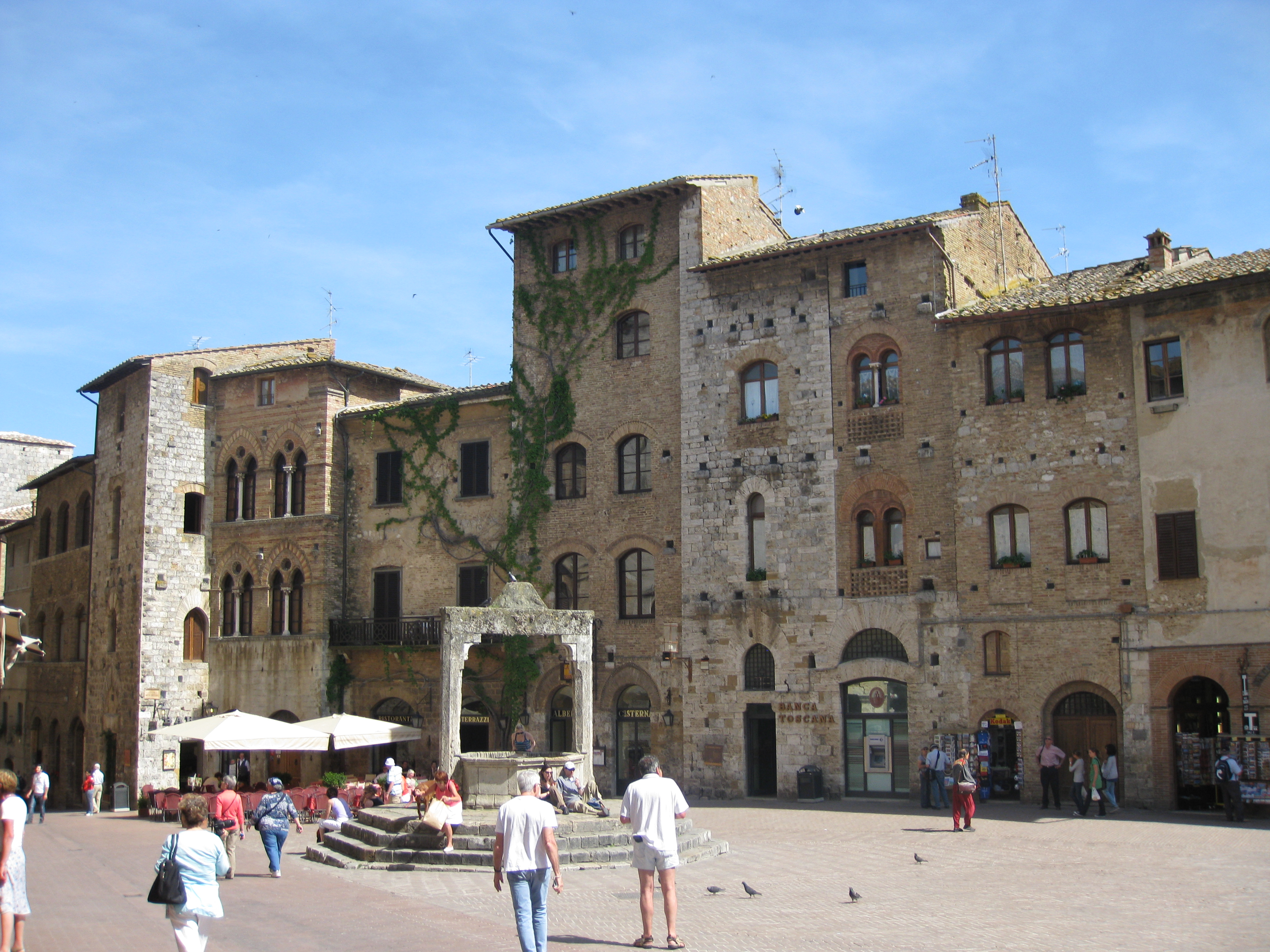
Medieval buildings surrounding the Piazza della Cisterna in San Gimignano include a Romanesque building with an automated telling machine set into its portal.

Piazza della Cisterna is a piazza in San Gimignano, Italy. It is triangular with a slight natural slope, and is connected to the nearby Piazza del Duomo by an open passage. The pavement is made of brick, and the piazza is surrounded by houses and medieval towers. There are currently 5 towers onto the square or very near it, and the bases of other five are visible on the façade of the various palaces, including the Ridolfi tower, which no longer exists since it collapsed in 1646 onto the Ridolfi family palace. The family palace divided the square into two alongside the short axis, thus making this relatively small area a concentrate of medieval architecture. In the south-west corner, the piazza meets the Arc of Becci, (l'arco dei Becci), an ancient city gate. The arc is flanked by the massive rectangular towers of Becci (torri dei Becci) on the left and Cugnanesi (torri dei Cugnanesi) on the right.

Past the access to via di Castello on the east side, which led down to the original Bishop’s castle, the northern side of the square is occupied by the renaissance Cortesi Palace, which extended up to the torre del Diavolo, and extends along the north side of the square including the old houses of the Cattani family. The remains of two pre-existing towers of the Cattani palace are clearly visible onto the façade of the Cortesi Palace.

The west side is adorned with various towers, like the twin towers of Ardinghelli and the tower of palazzo Pellari visible over the roofs.

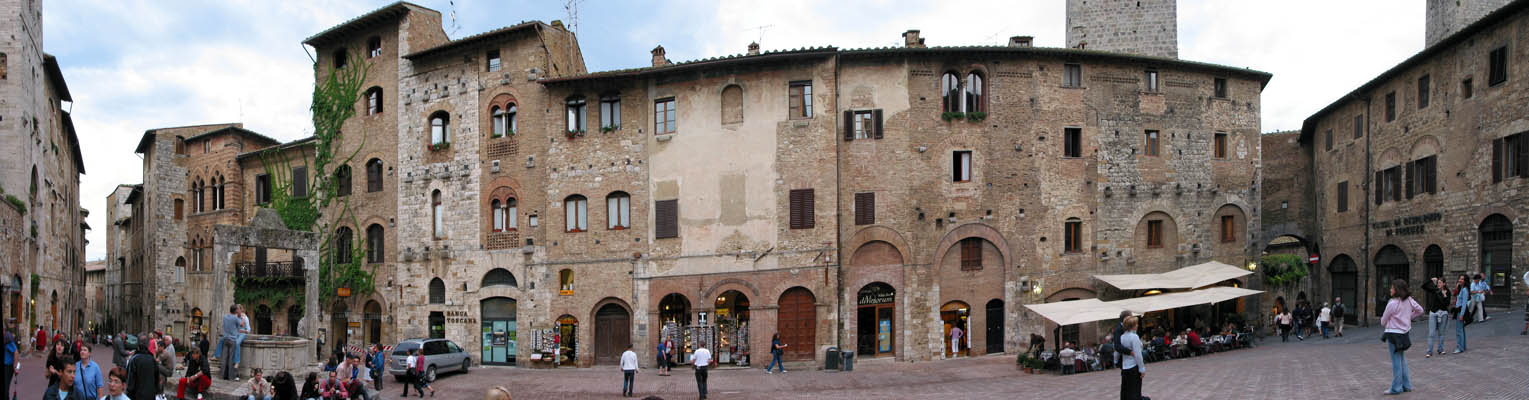
Piazza della Cisterna

== History ==
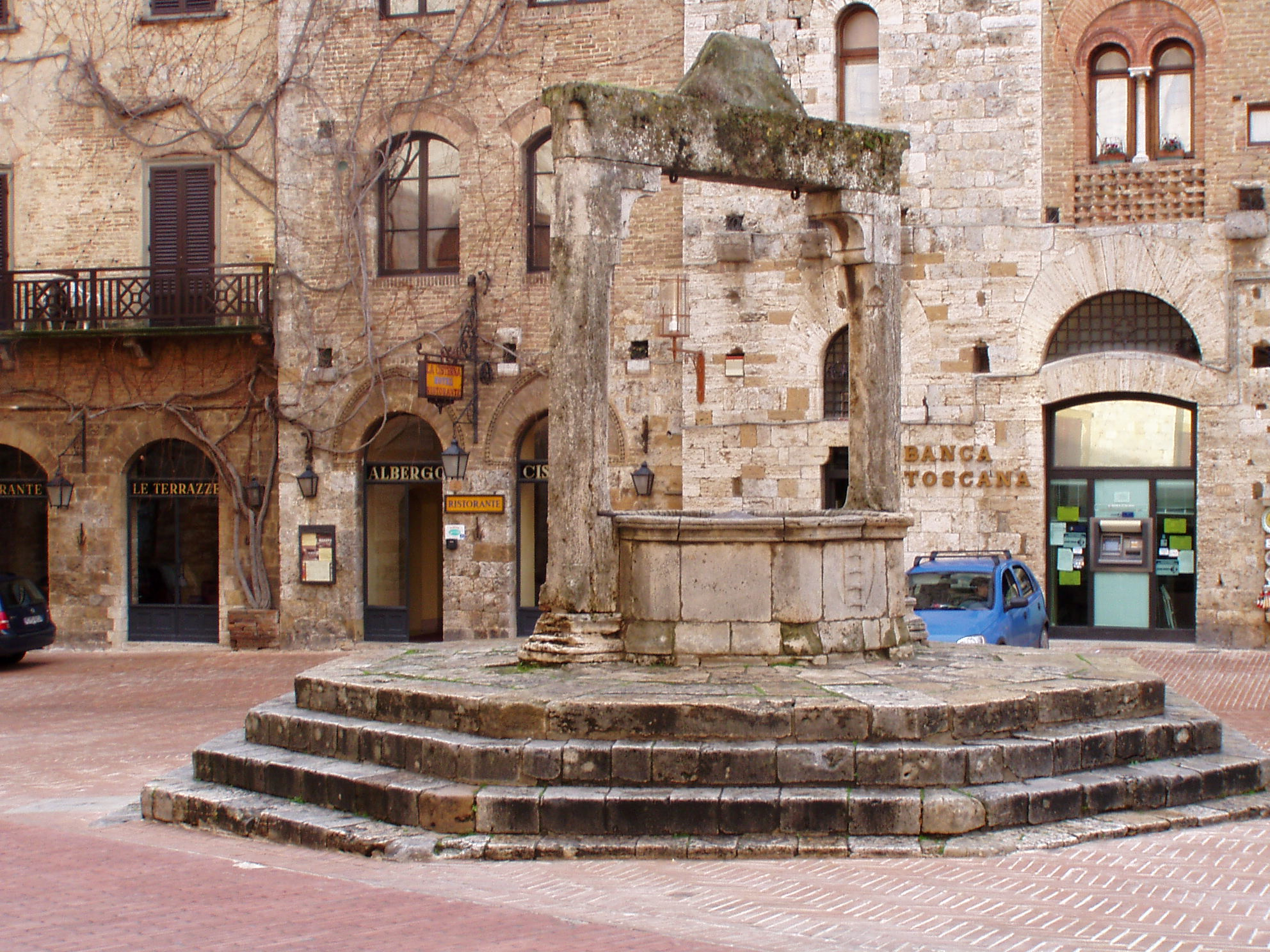
The cistern

The piazza is located at the intersection of two main streets of the village of San Gimignano: la via Francigena that run north to south and la via Pisa - Siena that runs east to west. The piazza was used as a market and a stage for festivals and tournaments. It is said that Picansichado Ghezzi, a merchant and horse trader, frequently used the piazza to sell goods. Originally the area was divided in two squares by the palace and tall tower of the Ridolfi family, the Piazza dell’ Olmo in the inferior and western part and the Piazza delle Taverne in the eastern side and with the cisterna in the middle. In 1646 the tall Ridolfi tower suddenly collapsed, destroying the palace, so the two squares were merged into one: the Piazza della Cisterna.

The piazza is named after the underground cistern (Cisterna) built in 1287. The cistern is capped by a travertine octagonal pedestal, which was built in 1346 under the mayor Guccio Malavolti, whose coat of arms with the ladder is carved onto the stones, and is close to the center of the square.
