= SanGimignano1300 =

Coordinates: 43.4673°N 11.0427°E

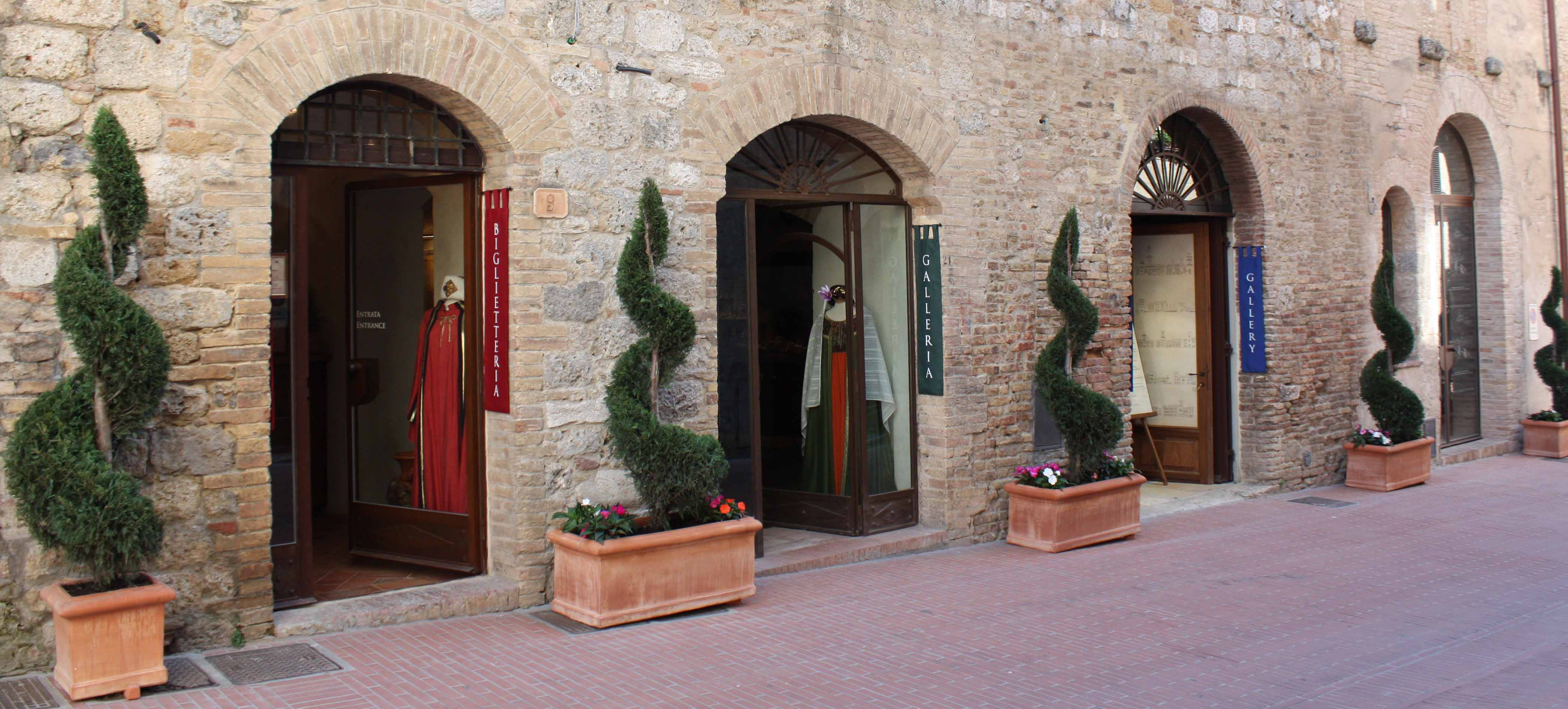
- Established: 2010
- Location: Via Costarella, n 3 - 53037 San Gimignano (Italy)
- Type: Artistic and historic museum
- Website: sangimignano1300.com

SanGimignano1300 is an artistic and historical museum located in the old city of San Gimignano. The museum was inaugurated in February 2010.

== Location ==
The exhibition is located in a renovated old church in the very centre of San Gimignano. It was moved from its initial location (Palazzo Gamucci joined with Palazzo Ficarelli) in late 2013.

== Galleries of initial museum ==
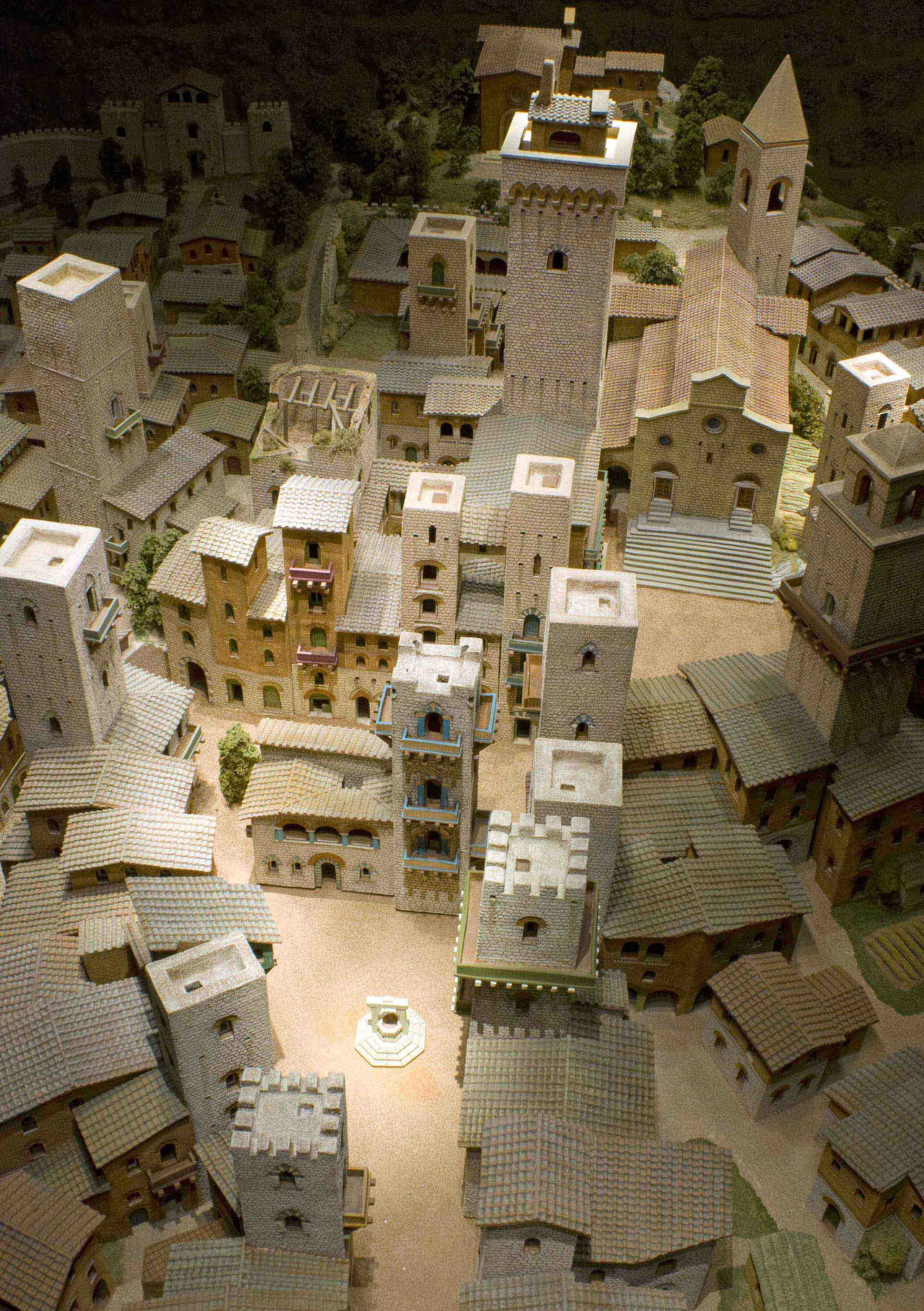
SanGimignano1300

After the relocation in 2013-2014 the museum was not fully rebuilt as the original museum, described below.

The museum presents 10 main galleries. The Via Francigena and its routes of pilgrimage during the Middle Ages exhibition room introduce the large reproduction 1:100 scale of the city of San Gimignano during the 14th century, entirely hand-made in ceramic by Michelangelo and Raffaello Rubino. Several deepening and details of the city and rural life, as well as descriptions about the various arts and professions of the time are represented in the other galleries.

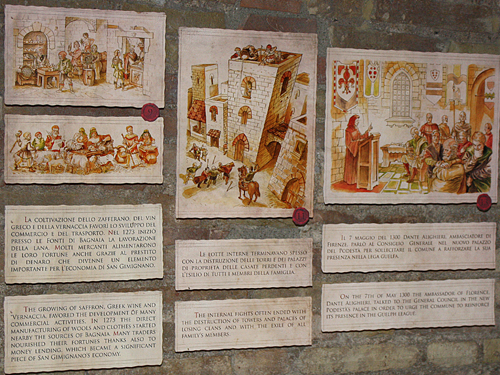
A Graphic Timeline

The SanGimignano1300 museum pays tribute to the painter Memmo di Filipuccio with two installations presenting the revisit of his work. Filipuccio depicted an accurate and detailed image of the independent and unconventional society of the city during the beginning of the 14th century. The museum's historical and educational itinerary includes paintings by Enrico Guerrini presenting a number of important moments in the history of San Gimignano from Etruscan times up to modern days.

== Recognition ==
In 2011 the museum was awarded with the patronage of the National Italian UNESCO Commission for the elevated and qualified formative value of its educational proposals “History, Art, and Tradition”.

== Relocation ==
In 2013 the main exhibition of the city was moved from the vacated vaulted ground floor up into the back yard. During the relocation the base had been cut into sectors. This has led to visible damage to the base. The model city is exposed to the sun and rain, but during heavy rain it is being covered with a large foil. It is also unprotected from possible wear from the public during opening hours. The main shop has also been moved into an adjacent part of the museum, where SanGimignano1300 also earlier had space. Entrance is now free, but boxes for donations are present.

== Restoration in new location ==
In 2013-2014 the exhibition, shop and workshop were moved from the original position to its present location. The exhibition was dismantled, rebuilt and partly restored; since there had been wear on the base and colouring during the outside placement, as mentioned in the above chapter. Entrance is now fully based on donations.

== See also ==
- List of museums in Italy
- World Heritage Site
