= Pier Francesco Fiorentino =

Italian painter

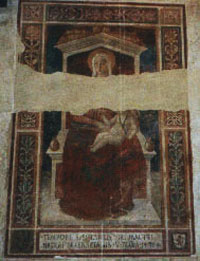
Madonna col bambino in trono (1480), Palazzo Vicarile de Certaldo

Pier Francesco Fiorentino (1444/1445 – after 1497) was a 15th-century painter active in San Gimignano for much of his mature life, depicting religious-themed subjects.

== Biography ==
Fiorentino, the son of the Florentine painter Bartolomeo di Donato, was born in Florence and received his first art education in his father's workshop. At age 25 he was ordained as a priest. He joined in the circle of painter Benozzo Gozzoli, and worked with him in San Gimignano and Certaldo during the 1460s.

== Works ==
An altarpiece in the Gallery at Empoli dates from about 1474. In 1475 he worked together with Domenico Ghirlandaio on the decoration of the nave of the Duomo of San Gimignano. In that same year he painted an Enthroned Madonna and Child with Saints Matthew the Apostle, William hermit, Barbara and Sebastiano for the Chapel of St William in the Collegiata of Empoli; the work is now exhibited in the Museum adjoining the church. He signed a Madonna and Saints (1494) in Sant'Agostino Church, San Gimignano and a Tobias and the Angels (1497).

== See also ==
- Anonymous masters

== Sources ==
- Anna Padoa Rizzo (eds), Art and patronage in Val d'Elsa and Era, Florence, Octavo, 1997, pp. 34–45, 66, 77–78, 81–82, 114 – 115 ISBN 88-8030-104-7
- Francesca Allegri – Massimo Tosi, Certaldo poetry of the Middle Ages, series "Millennial Elsa Valley", Certaldo (Florence), Federighi Publishers, 2002, pp. 102–103 (on the frescoes of the Praetorian Palace of Certaldo).
- Rosanna Caterina Proto Pisani, Empoli. Routes of the Museum of the Collegiate Church and the Church of Santo Stefano, "Lo Studiolo", Florence, Becocci – Scala, 2005, pp. 39, 42.
- Rosanna Caterina Proto Pisani (eds), Museum of the Collegiate Church of Sant'Andrea in Empoli, series "Small Great Museums", Florence, Polistampa Publishing, 2006, pp. 110–111 ISBN 88-596-0083-9.
- R. Razzi, The Sanctuary of the Madonna di San Gimignano in Pancole. The History and the Image, Poggibonsi, Graphic Arts Nencini, 2002.
