= San Gimignano =

- Comune
- Comune di San Gimignano
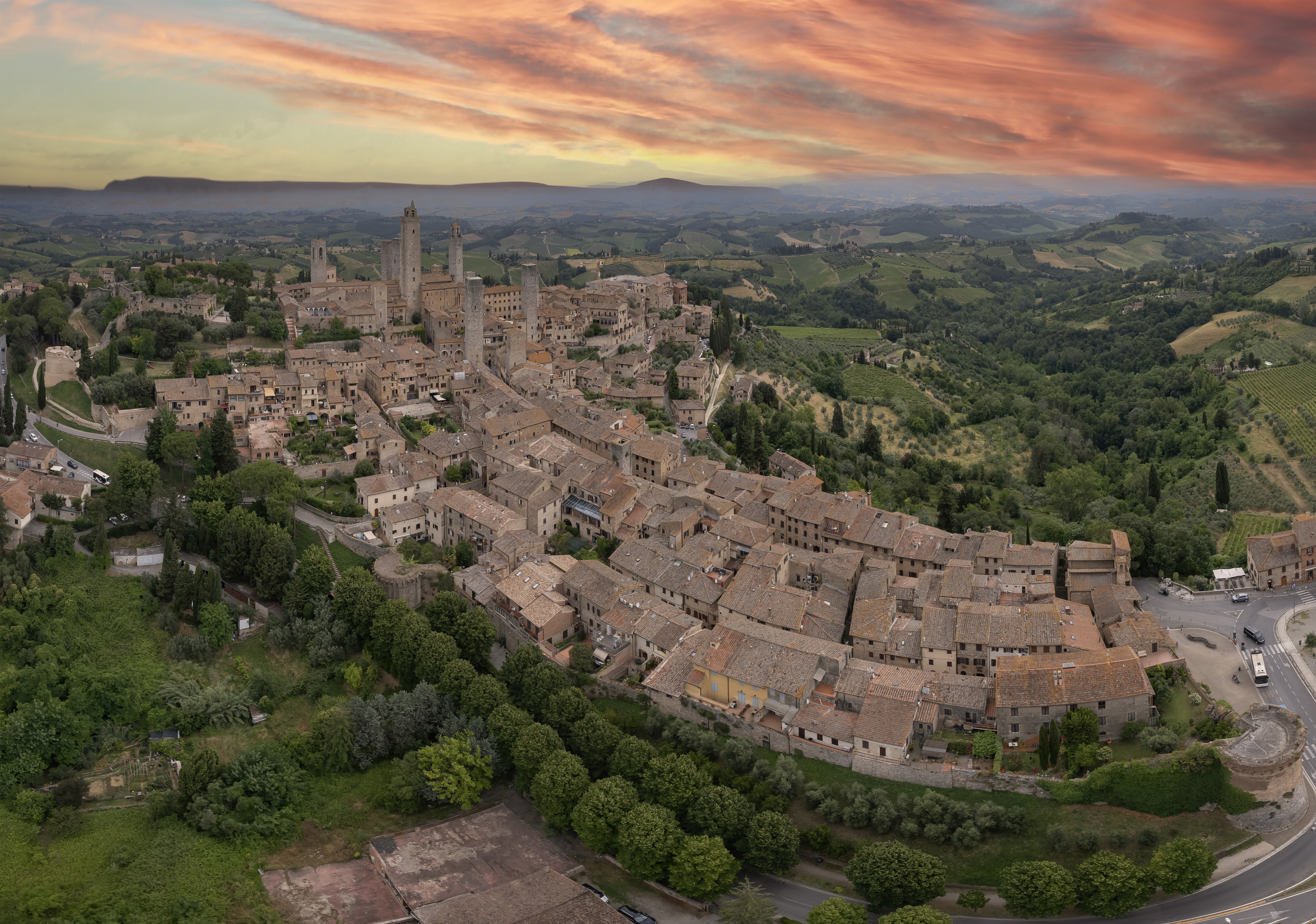
- Aerial view of the town

- Coat of arms

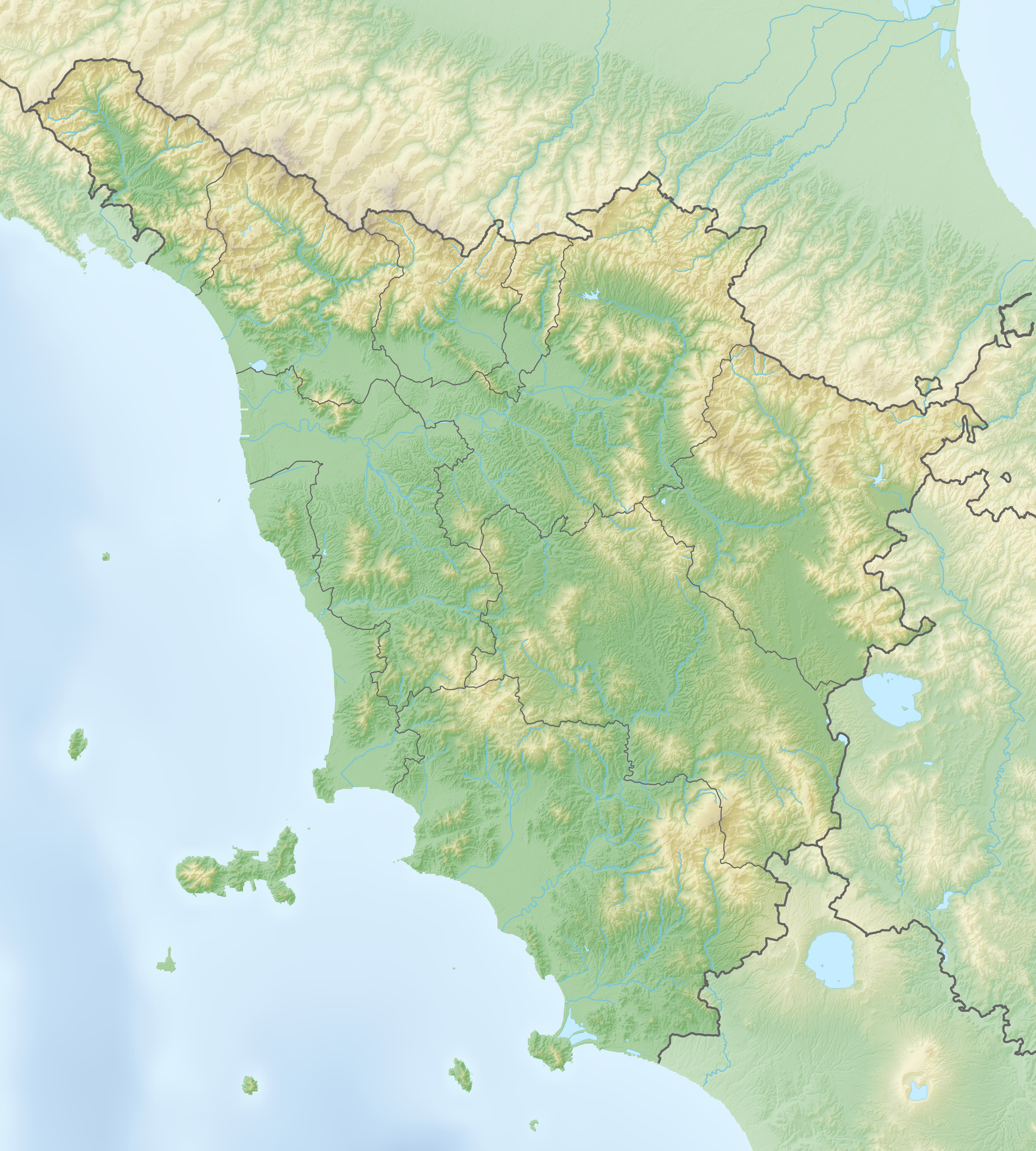
- Location within Italy Location within Tuscany
- Coordinates: 43.468°N 11.042°E
- Country: Italy
- Region: Tuscany
- Province: Siena (SI)
- Frazioni: Badia a Elmi, Castel San Gimignano, Pancole, San Donato, Santa Lucia, Ulignano

Government
  - Mayor: Andrea Marrucci (PD)

Area
  - Total: 138 km^{2} (53 sq mi)
- Elevation: 324 m (1,063 ft)

Population (31 December 2016)
  - Total: 7,780
  - Density: 56.4/km^{2} (146/sq mi)
- Demonym: Sangimignanesi
- Time zone: UTC+1 (CET)
  - Summer (DST): UTC+2 (CEST)
- Postal code: 53037
- Dialing code: 0577
- Patron saint: St. Geminianus, Saint Fina
- Saint day: 31 January, 12 March
- Website: Official website

UNESCO World Heritage Site
- Official name: Historic Centre of San Gimignano
- Criteria: Cultural: (i)(iii)(iv)
- Reference: 550
- Inscription: 1990 (14th Session)
- Area: 13.88 ha (34.3 acres)

San Gimignano (Italian pronunciation: [san dʒimiɲˈɲaːno]; named after St. Geminianus) is a small walled medieval hill town in the province of Siena, Tuscany, north-central Italy. Known as the Town of Five Towers, San Gimignano is famous for its medieval architecture, unique in the preservation of about a dozen of its tower houses, which, with its hilltop setting and encircling walls, form "an unforgettable skyline". Within the walls, the well-preserved buildings include notable examples of both Romanesque and Gothic architecture, with outstanding examples of secular buildings as well as churches. The Palazzo Comunale, the Collegiata and Church of Sant'Agostino contain frescos, including cycles dating from the 14th and 15th centuries. The "Historic Centre of San Gimignano" is a UNESCO World Heritage Site. The town is also known for saffron, its dry-aged and saffron infused Golden Ham, pecorino cheese, and local white wine—Vernaccia di San Gimignano—produced from the ancient variety of Vernaccia grape grown on the sandstone hillsides of the area.

== Territory ==
The municipality of San Gimignano extends for 138 km² and is located on a hill in Valdelsa. The altitude difference is between a minimum of 64 meters a.s.l. in the plain of the Elsa River near Certaldo at a maximum of 631 meters in the area of Cornocchio.

San Gimignano borders the municipalities of Barberino Tavarnelle, Certaldo, Colle di Val d'Elsa, Gambassi Terme, Poggibonsi and Volterra.

== History ==
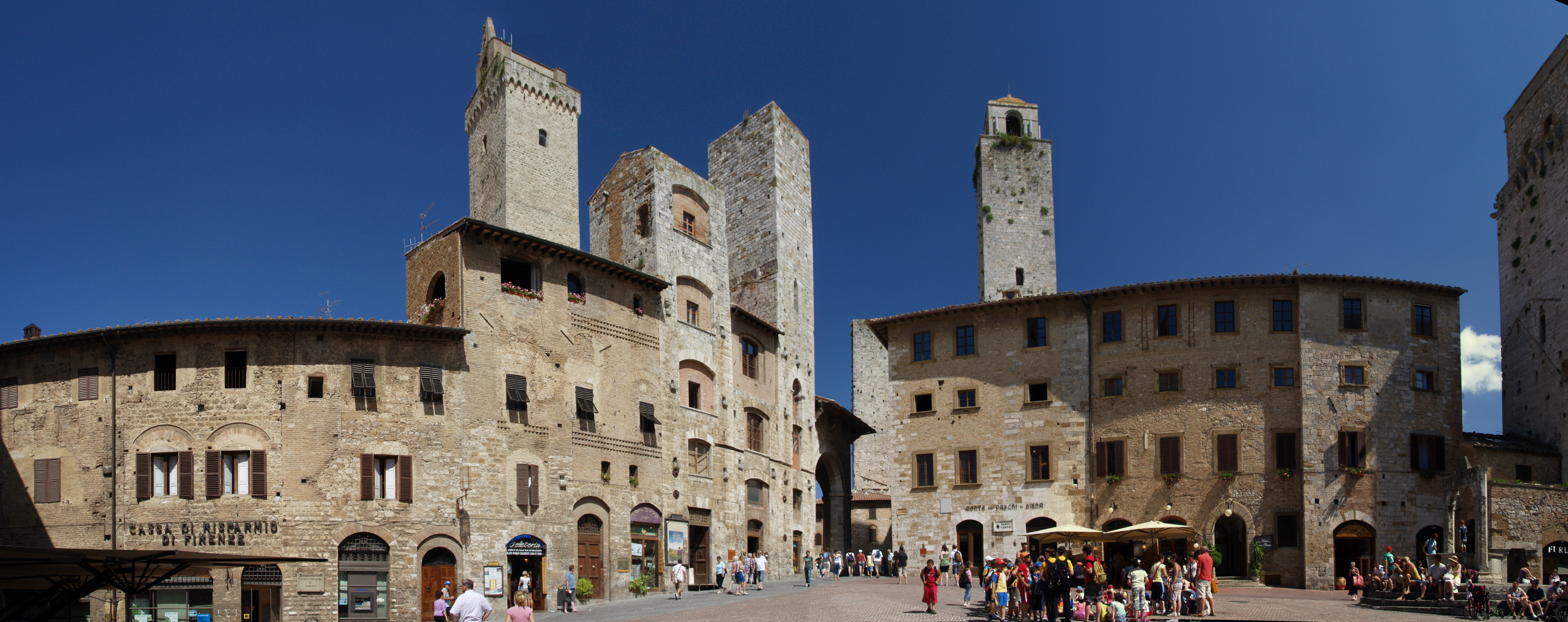
The central Piazza della Cisterna

In the 3rd century BC a small Etruscan village stood on the site of San Gimignano. Chroniclers Lupi, Coppi and Pecori relate that during the Catiline conspiracy against the Roman Republic in the 1st century, two patrician brothers, Muzio and Silvio, fled Rome for Valdelsa and built two castles, Mucchio and Silvia (now San Gimignano). The name of Silvia was changed to San Gimignano in 450 AD after Bishop Geminianus, the Saint of Modena, intervened to spare the castle from destruction by the followers of Attila the Hun. As a result, a church was dedicated to the saint, and in the 6th and 7th centuries a walled village grew up around it, subsequently called the "Castle of San Gimignano" or Castle of the Forest because of the extensive woodland surrounding it. From 929 the town was ruled by the bishop of Volterra.

In the Middle Ages and the Renaissance era, it was a stopping point for Catholic pilgrims on their way to Rome and the Vatican, as it sits on the medieval Via Francigena. The city's development was also improved by the trade of agricultural products from the fertile neighboring hills, in particular saffron, used in both cooking and dyeing cloth, and Vernaccia wine, said to inspire popes and poets.

In 1199, the city made itself independent of the bishops of Volterra and established a podestà, and set about enriching the commune with churches and public buildings. However, the peace of the town was disturbed for the next two centuries by conflict between the Guelphs and the Ghibellines, and family rivalries within San Gimignano. This resulted in competing families building tower houses of increasingly greater heights. Towards the end of the Medieval period, there were 72 tower houses in number, up to 70 metres (230 feet) tall. The rivalry was finally restrained when the local council ordained that no tower was to be taller than that adjacent to the Palazzo Comunale.

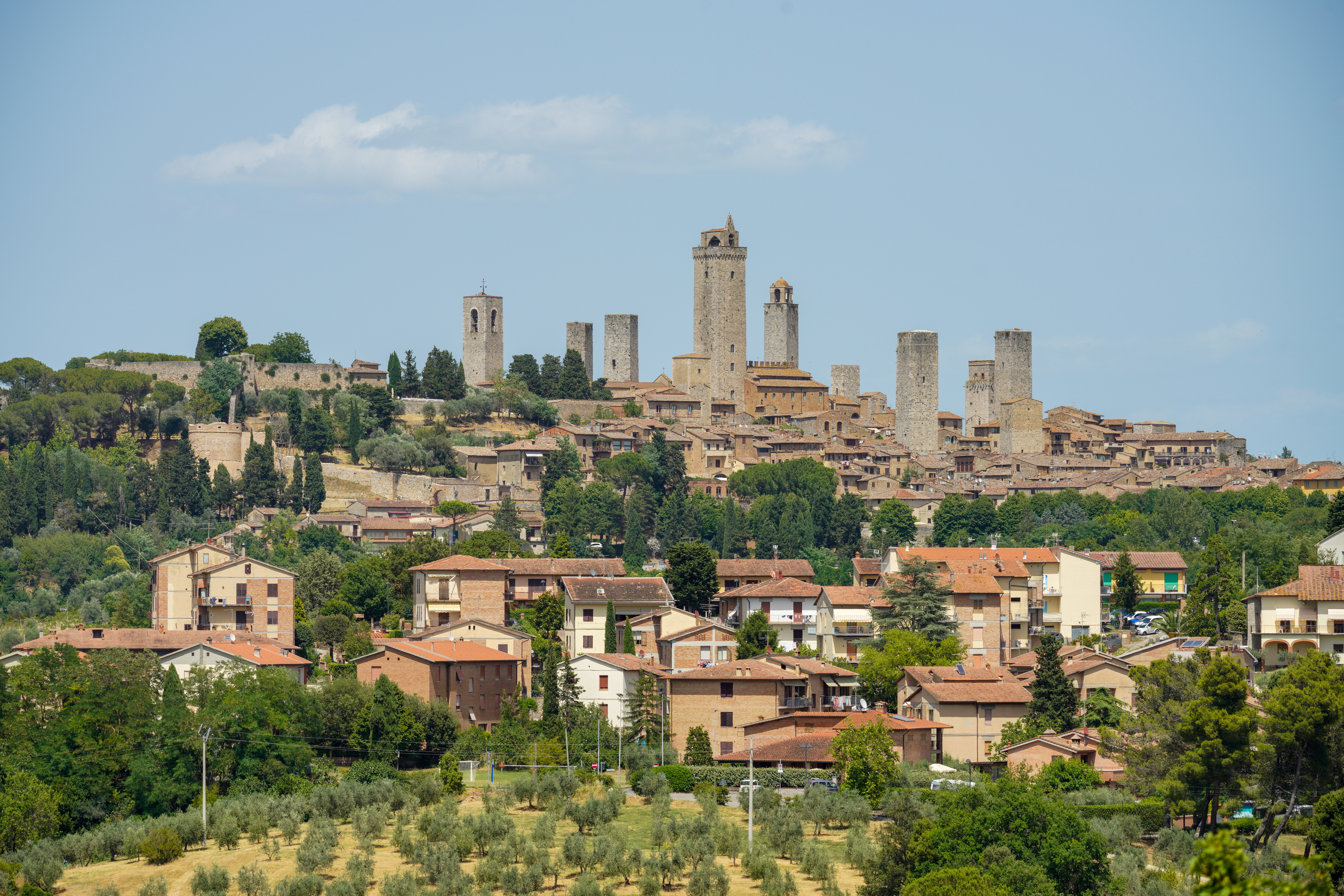
View of the town from the south

While the official patron is Saint Geminianus, the town also honours Saint Fina, known also as Seraphina and Serafina, who was born in San Gimignano 1238 and whose feast day is 12 March. The Chapel of Santa Fina in the Collegiate Church houses her shrine and frescos by Ghirlandaio. The house said to be her home still stands in the town.

On 8 May 1300, San Gimignano hosted Dante Alighieri in his role as ambassador of the Guelph League in Tuscany.

The city flourished until 1348, when it was struck by the Black Death that affected all of Europe, and about half the townsfolk died. The town submitted to the rule of Florence. Initially, some Gothic palazzi were built in the Florentine style, and many of the towers were reduced to the height of the houses. There was little subsequent development, and San Gimignano remained preserved in its medieval state until the 19th century, when its status as a touristic and artistic resort began to be recognized.

== Description ==
The city is on the ridge of a hill, with its main axis being north–south. It is encircled by three walls and has at its highest point, to the west, the ruins of a fortress dismantled in the 16th century. There are eight entrances into the city, set into the second wall, which dates from the 12th and 13th centuries. The main gates are Porta San Giovanni on the ridge extending south, Porta San Matteo to the north west and Porta S. Jacopo to the north east. The main streets are Via San Matteo and Via San Giovanni, which cross the city from north to south. At the heart of the town are four squares: the Piazza Duomo, on which stands the Collegiate Church; the Piazza della Cisterna, the Piazza Pecori and the Piazza delle Erbe. To the north of the town is another significant square, Piazza Agostino, on which stands the Church of Sant' Agostino. The locations of the Collegiate Church and Sant' Agostino's and their piazzas effectively divide the town into two regions.

== Main sights ==
Historic Centre of San Gimignano
UNESCO World Heritage Site
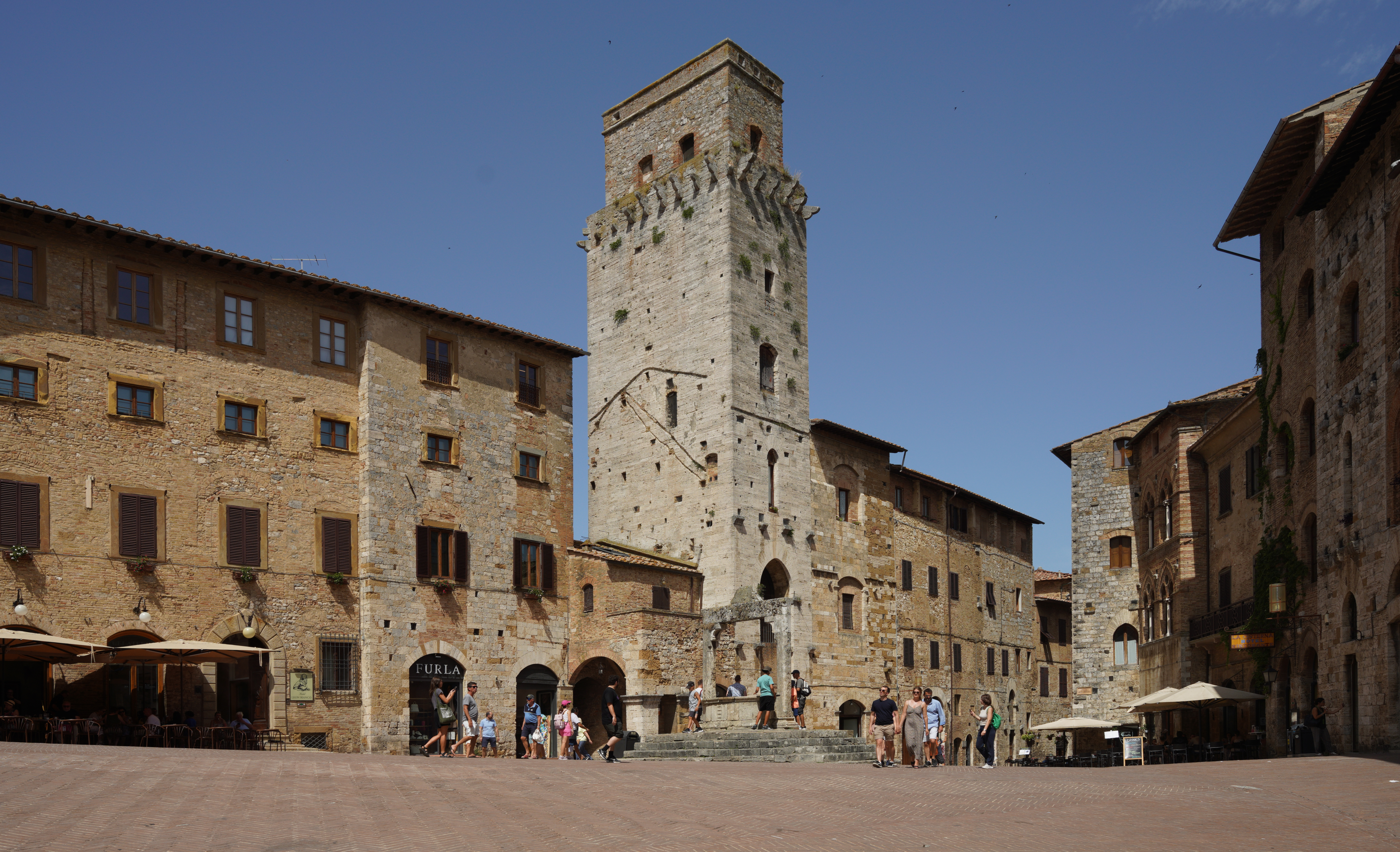
- Interactive map of Historic Centre of San Gimignano
- Criteria: Cultural: i, iii, iv
- Reference: 550
- Inscription: 1990 (14th Session)
- Area: 13.88 ha (34.3 acres)

The town of San Gimignano has many examples of Romanesque and Gothic architecture, which are distinguished from each other by their round and pointed arches, respectively. As well as churches and medieval fortifications, there are examples of Romanesque secular and domestic architecture. A particular feature which is typical of the region of Siena is the depressed arches of openings, with doorways often having a second low arch set beneath a semi-circular or pointed arch. Both Romanesque and Gothic windows sometimes have a bifurcate form, with two openings divided by a stone mullion under a single arch. A 1:100 recreation of the city in the 14th century is housed in the SanGimignano1300 museum.

=== Squares ===
==== Piazza della Cisterna ====
This piazza, entered from Via San Giovanni, is the main square of the town. It was named after the cistern constructed in 1287. It was once used to host markets, most famously utilized by Picansichado Ghezzi. It also hosted recreational actives like tournaments and festivals. It is triangular in shape, and is surrounded by medieval houses of different dates, among them are some fine examples of Romanesque and Gothic palazzos. At the centre of the piazza stands a well which was the main source of water for the town's residents. The structure dates from 1346. Although much of it has been renewed in the late 20th century, parts of the paving date from the 13th century.

==== Piazza Duomo ====
This piazza is to the north of Piazza della Cisterna, and is connected by a passage adjacent to an open loggia. To the west, at the top of the square, stands the Collegiate Church, reached by a broad flight of steps. The name of the square would seem to imply that this church was at one time a cathedral, but this is not the case. Other important buildings on the square include the Palazzo Comunale and the Palazzo Podesta, the house of the mayor. The Palazzo Podesta is distinguished by its huge arched loggia.

=== Towers ===
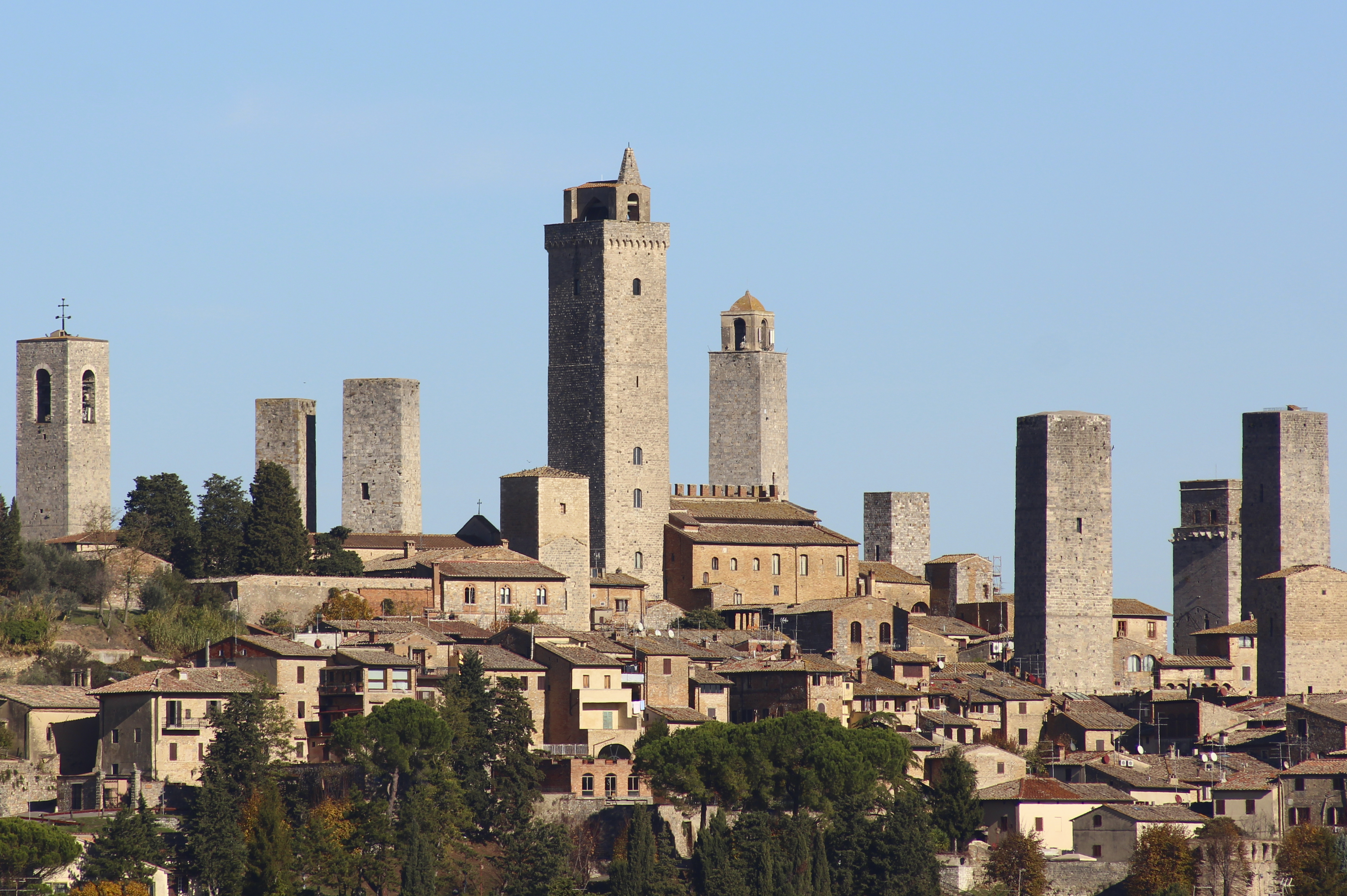
Towers in San Gimignano

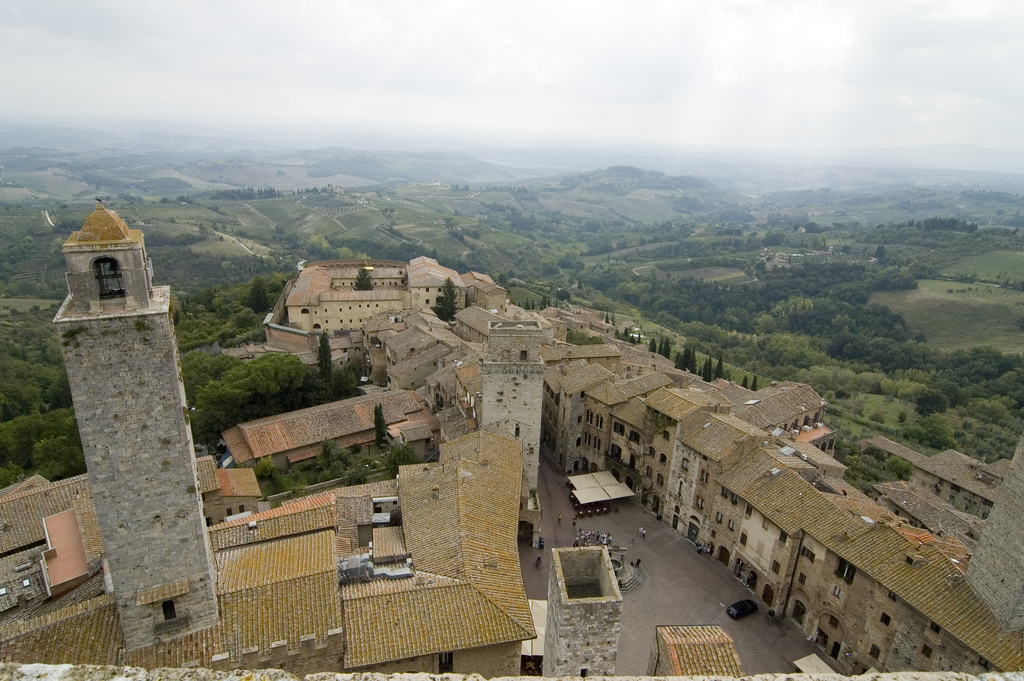
Torre Rognosa

While in other cities, such as Florence, most or all of their towers have been destroyed by wars, catastrophes, or urban renewal, San Gimignano has conserved the following 14 towers of varying heights, for which it is known internationally:

- Campanile della Collegiata
- Torri degli Ardinghelli
- Torre dei Becci
- Torre Campatelli
- Torre Chigi (1280)
- Torre dei Cugnanesi
- Torre del Diavolo
- Torre Ficherelli or Ficarelli
- Torre Grossa (1311), 54 metres (177 ft)
- Torre di Palazzo Pellari
- Casa-torre Pesciolini
- Torre Pettini
- Torre Rognosa, 51 metres (167 ft)
- Torri dei Salvucci

=== Churches ===
There are many churches in the town: the two main ones are the Collegiata, formerly a cathedral, and Sant'Agostino, housing many artworks from early Italian renaissance artists.

The Pieve di Santa Maria at Cèllole, a village in the municipality, is a Romanesque rural church with a baptistery.

=== Civic buildings ===
The Communal Palace, once seat of the podestà, is currently home of the town gallery, with works by Pinturicchio, Benozzo Gozzoli, Filippino Lippi, Domenico di Michelino, Pier Francesco Fiorentino and others. From Dante's Hall in the palace, access may be made to a Maesta fresco by Lippo Memmi, as well as the Torre del Podestà or Torre Grossa, 1311, which stands 54 metres (177 ft) high.

== Culture ==
San Gimignano is the birthplace of the poet Folgore da San Gimignano (1270–1332).

A fictionalized version of San Gimignano is featured in E. M. Forster's 1905 novel, Where Angels Fear to Tread as Monteriano.

M. C. Escher's 1923 woodcut San Gimignano depicts the celebrated towers.

Marcel L'Herbier used San Gimignano as one of the main locations in his 1925 film Feu Mathias Pascal. L'Herbier's love of architecture ensured that views of the towers and shots of various streets and piazze were heavily featured.

Franco Zeffirelli used San Gimignano as a stand-in for the town of Assisi in his 1972 Saint Francis of Assisi biopic Brother Sun, Sister Moon. Most of the "Assisi" scenes were filmed here.

Tea with Mussolini, a 1999 drama about the plight of English and American expatriate women in Italy during World War II, was filmed in part in San Gimignano. The frescoes that the women save from being destroyed during the German Army's withdrawal are inside the Duomo, the town's main church. The account of this episode is, to a large extent, fictional, because, although there are reports of intended retribution against the town, there is no evidence of a plan to destroy the churches. However, the reference to risk of cultural destruction is historic, as the Allies bombed the area for ten days.

In the 2005 novel The Broker by John Grisham, Joel Backman takes his second of three wives on vacation in Italy to keep her from divorcing him. They rent a 14th-century monastery near San Gimignano for a month.

A 15th-century version of the town is featured in the 2009 video game Assassin's Creed II.

== Municipal government ==
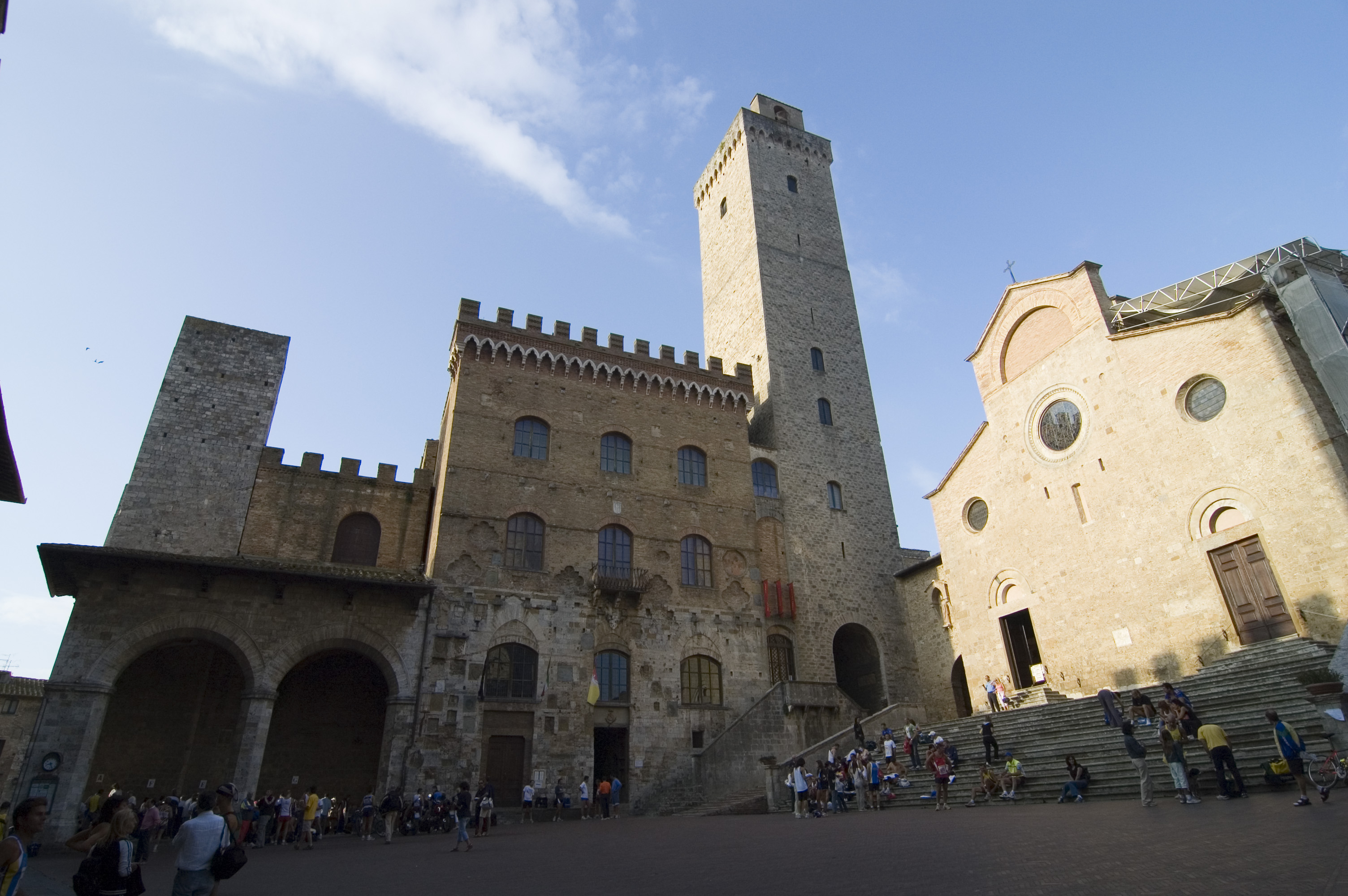
The Town Hall (Palazzo Comunale) nearby the Duomo

San Gimignano is headed by a mayor (sindaco) assisted by a legislative body, the consiglio comunale, and an executive body, the giunta comunale. Since 1995 the mayor and members of the consiglio comunale are directly elected together by resident citizens, while from 1945 to 1995 the mayor was chosen by the legislative body. The giunta comunale is chaired by the mayor, who appoints others members, called assessori. The offices of the comune are housed in a building usually called the municipio or palazzo comunale.

Since 1995 the mayor of San Gimignano is directly elected by citizens, originally every four, then every five years. The current mayor is Andrea Marrucci (PD), elected on 26 May 2019 with the 70.3% of the votes and re-elected on 9 June 2024 with 84.9% of the votes.

Mayor	Term start	Term end	Party
Franco Nencioni	24 April 1995	14 June 1999	PDS
Marco Lisi	14 June 1999	8 June 2009	DS
Giacomo Bassi	8 June 2009	27 May 2019	PD
Andrea Marrucci	27 May 2019	incumbent	PD

== Demographic evolution ==
Historical Population of San Gimignano

Year	Pop.	±%
1861	7,250	—
1871	8,251	+13.8%
1881	8,539	+3.5%
1901	10,066	+17.9%
1911	10,921	+8.5%
1921	11,471	+5.0%

Year	Pop.	±%
1931	10,926	−4.8%
1936	11,270	+3.1%
1951	11,297	+0.2%
1961	10,039	−11.1%
1971	7,673	−23.6%
1981	7,371	−3.9%

Year	Pop.	±%
1991	6,956	−5.6%
2001	7,114	+2.3%
2011	7,677	+7.9%
2021	7,518	−2.1%

== Twin towns – sister cities ==
San Gimignano is twinned with:

- Český Krumlov, Czech Republic
- Meersburg, Germany
- (Georgia (country)) Mestia, Georgia

== Panoramic view ==
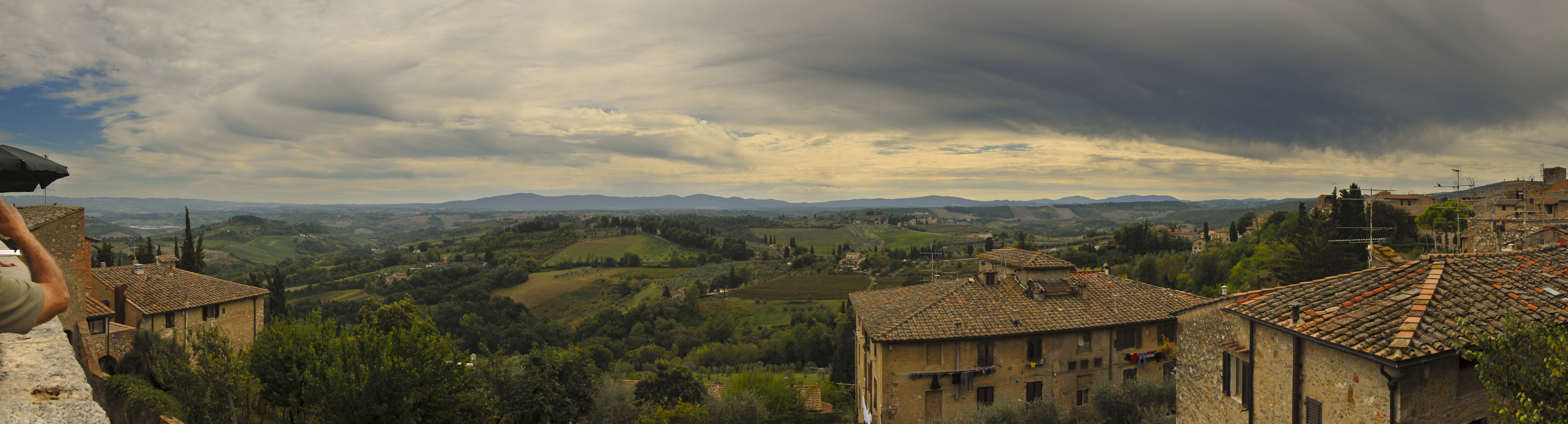
Panorama of San Gimignano and surrounding landscape
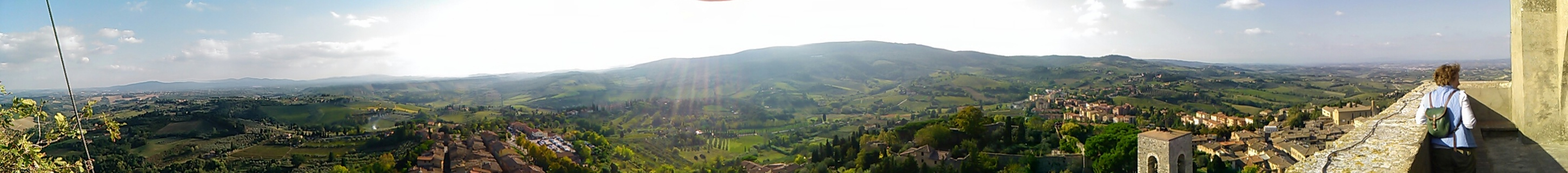
East View from Torre Grossa, San Gimignano
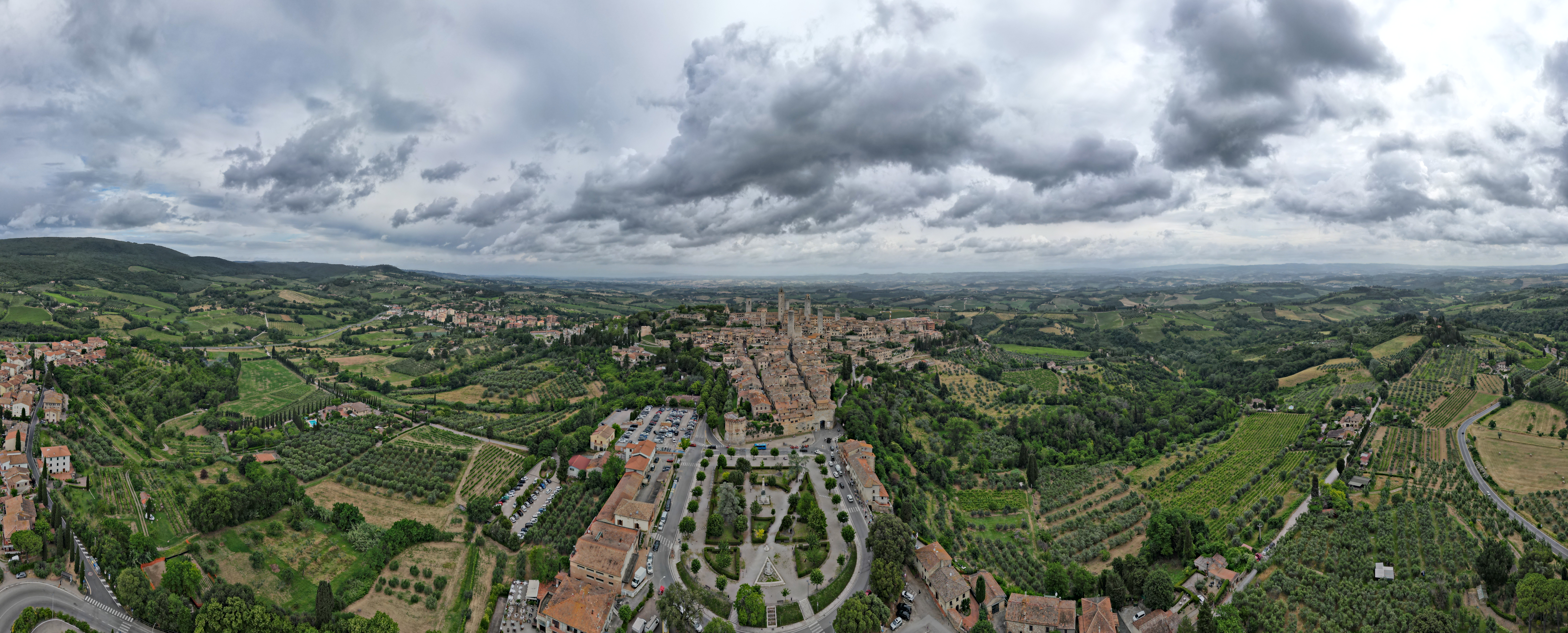
Panorama

== Gallery ==
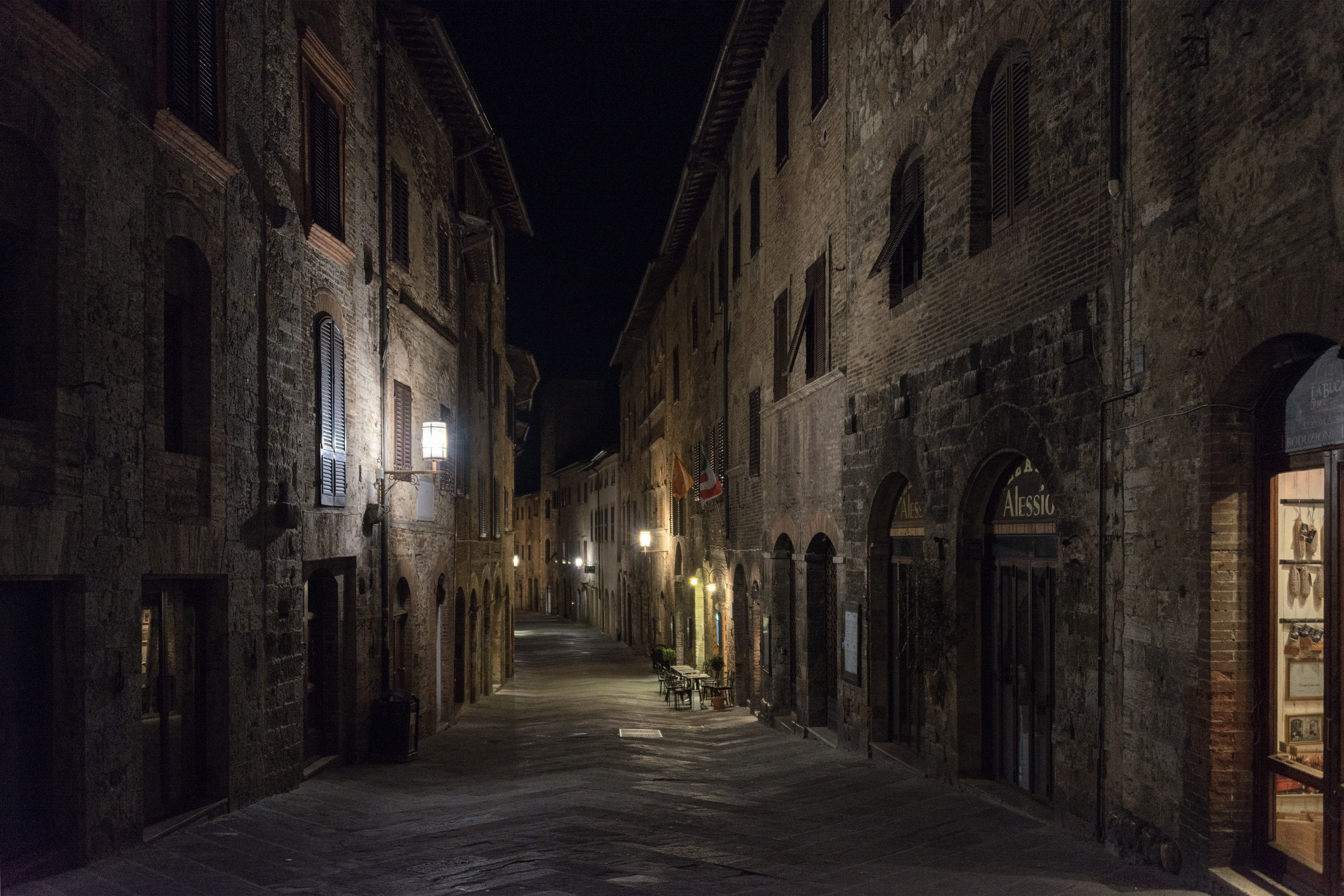

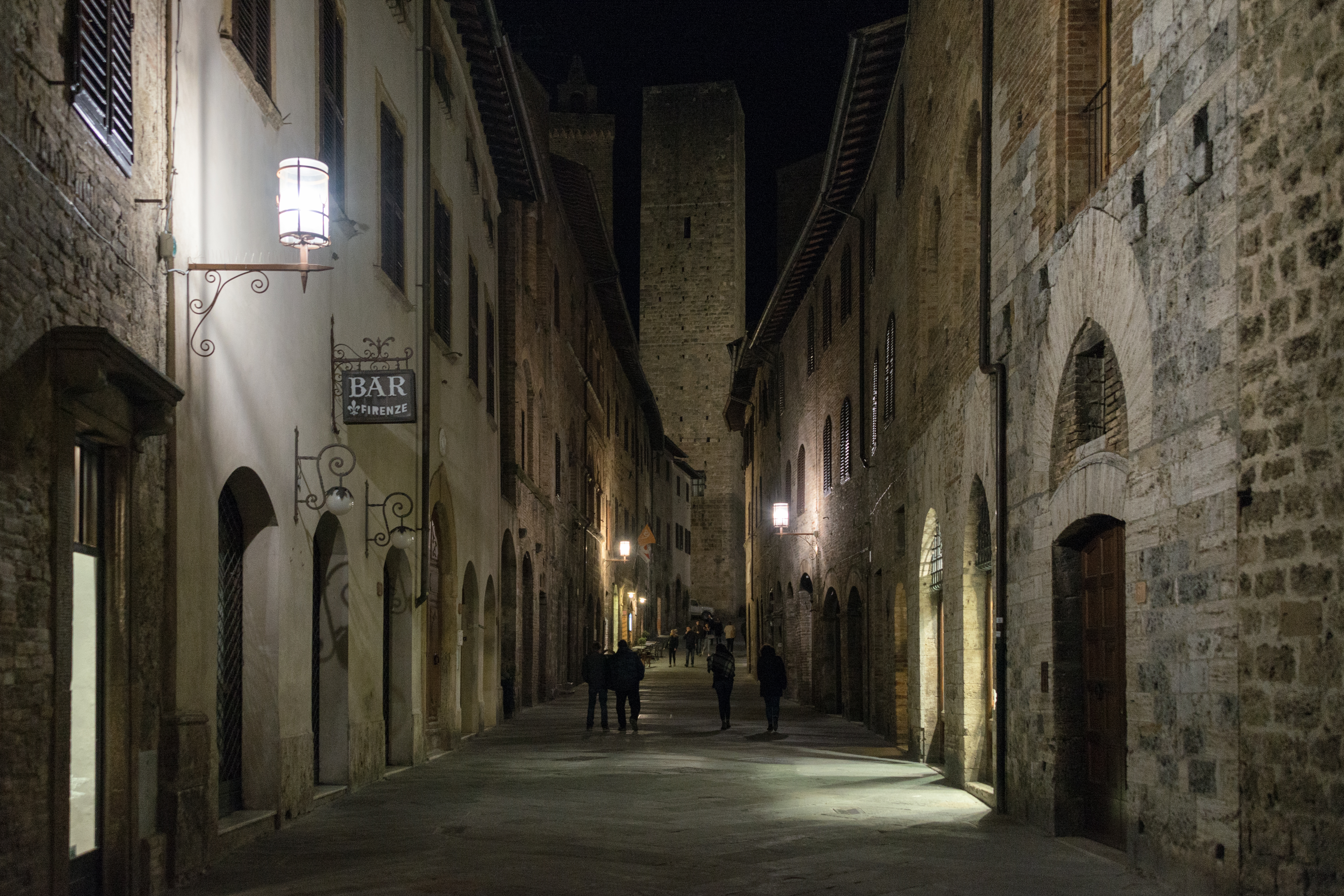

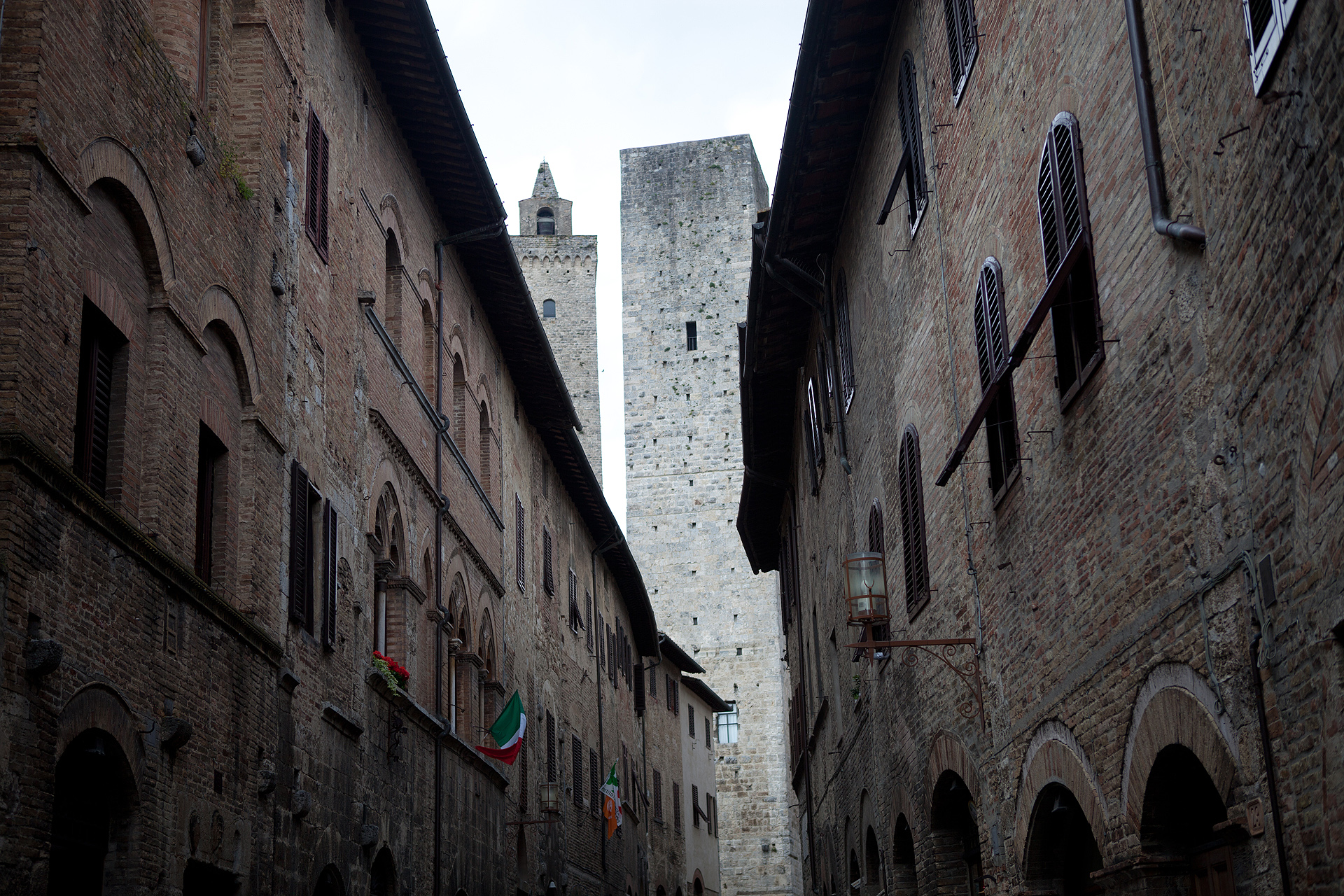

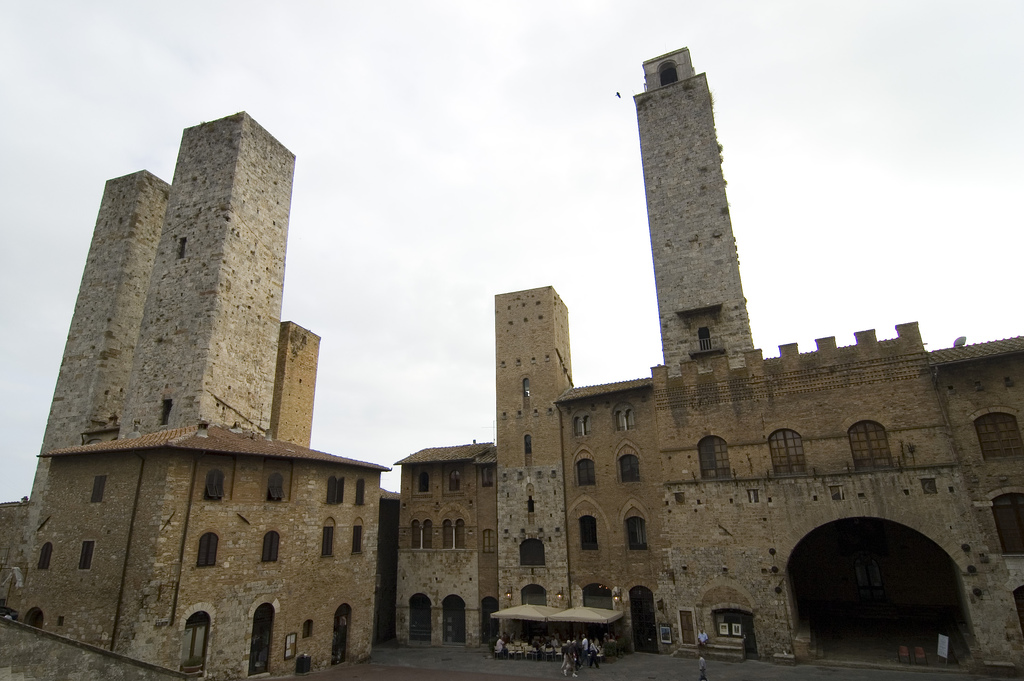

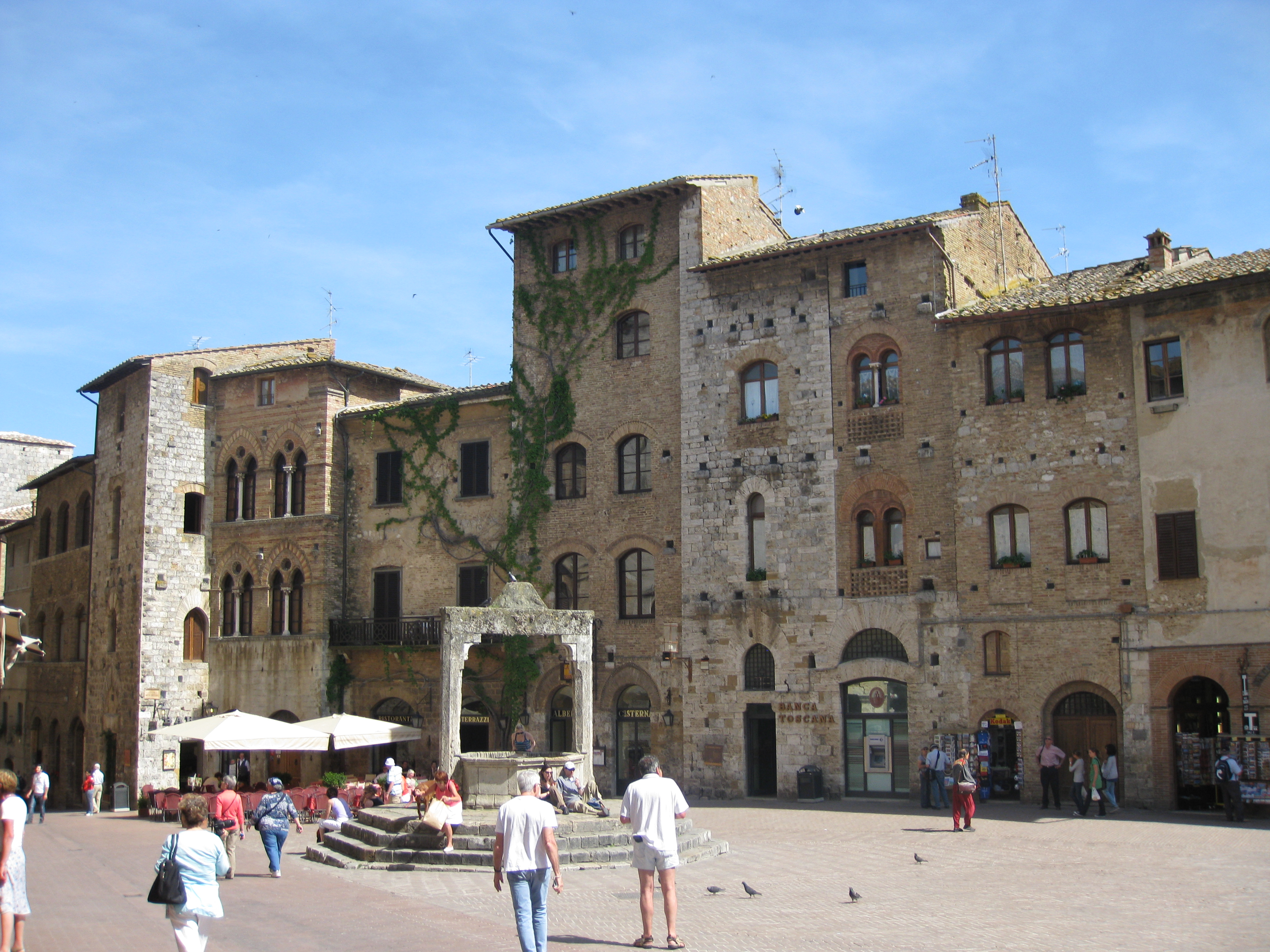

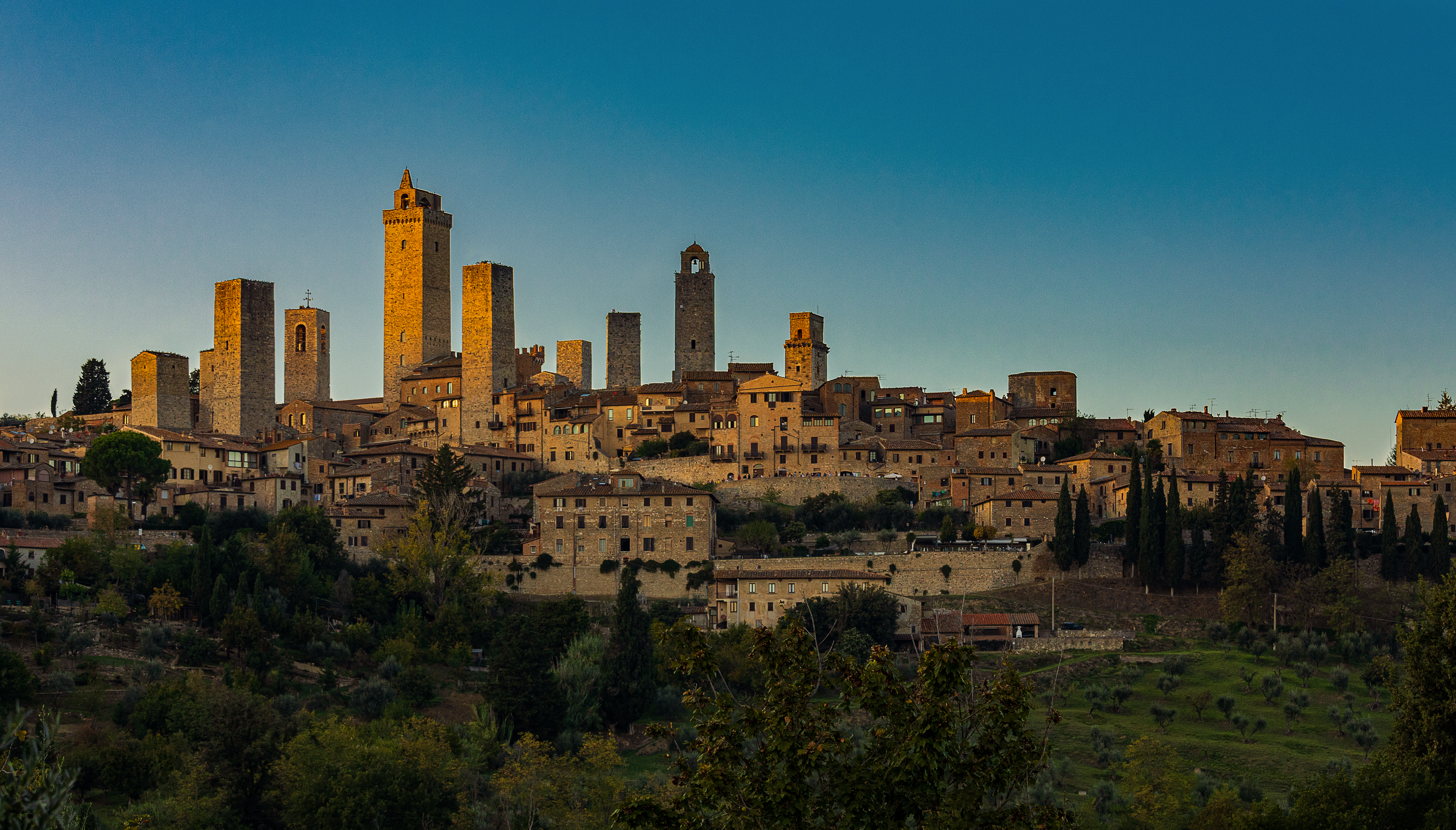

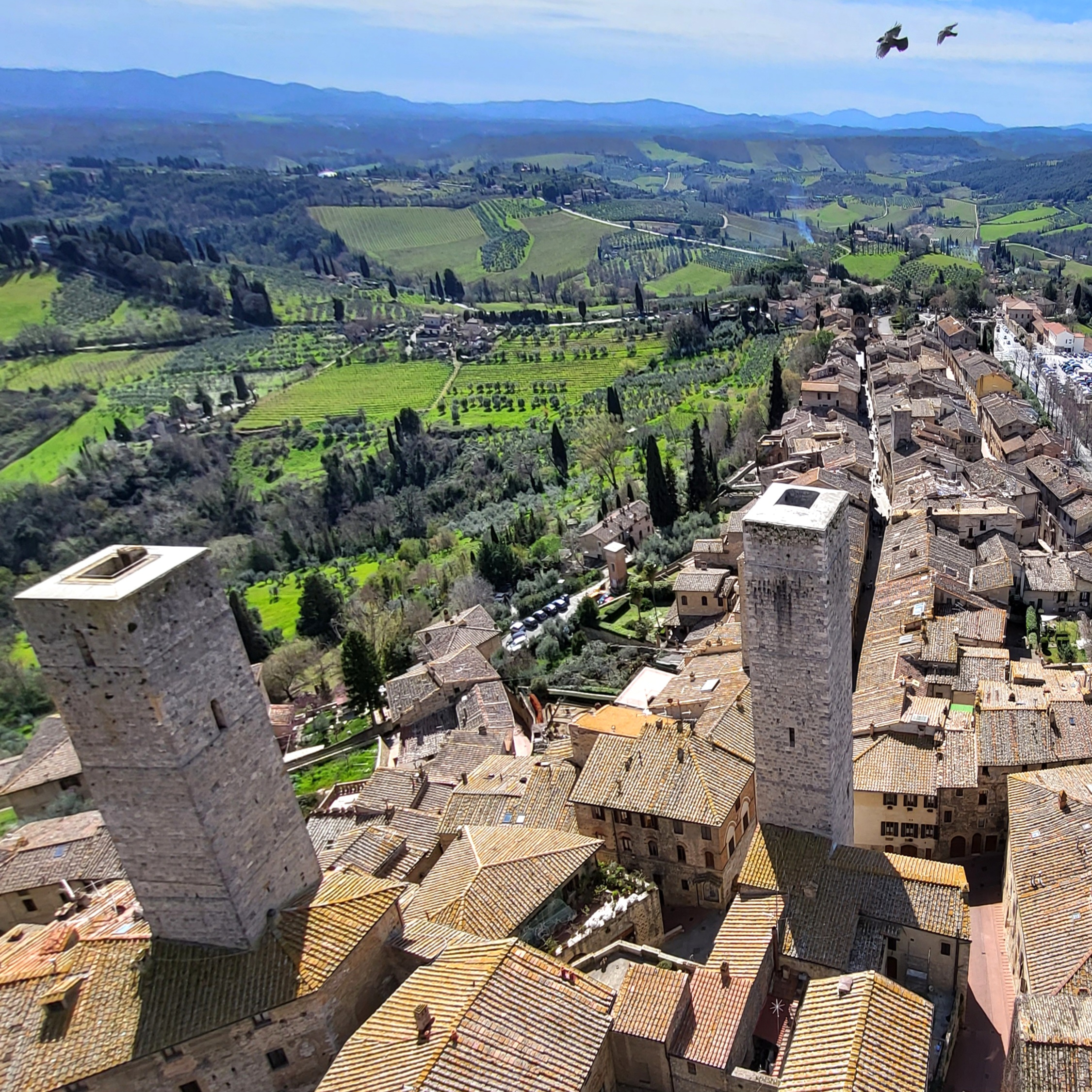

== In art ==
- Wall mural in Grossi Florentino, executed by students of Napier Waller under supervision

== Sources ==
- AA. VV., Medieval Churches of the Val d'Elsa. The territories of the Via Francigena between Siena and San Gimignano, Empoli, dell'Acero Publishers, 1996. ISBN 88-86975-08-2
- Vantaggi, Rosella (1979). San Gimignano: Town of the Fine Towers. Plurigraf.
- von der Haegen, Anne Mueller; Strasser, Ruth (2001). Art and Architecture of Tuscany. Kőnemann. ISBN 3-8290-2652-8.
