= Torre Grossa =

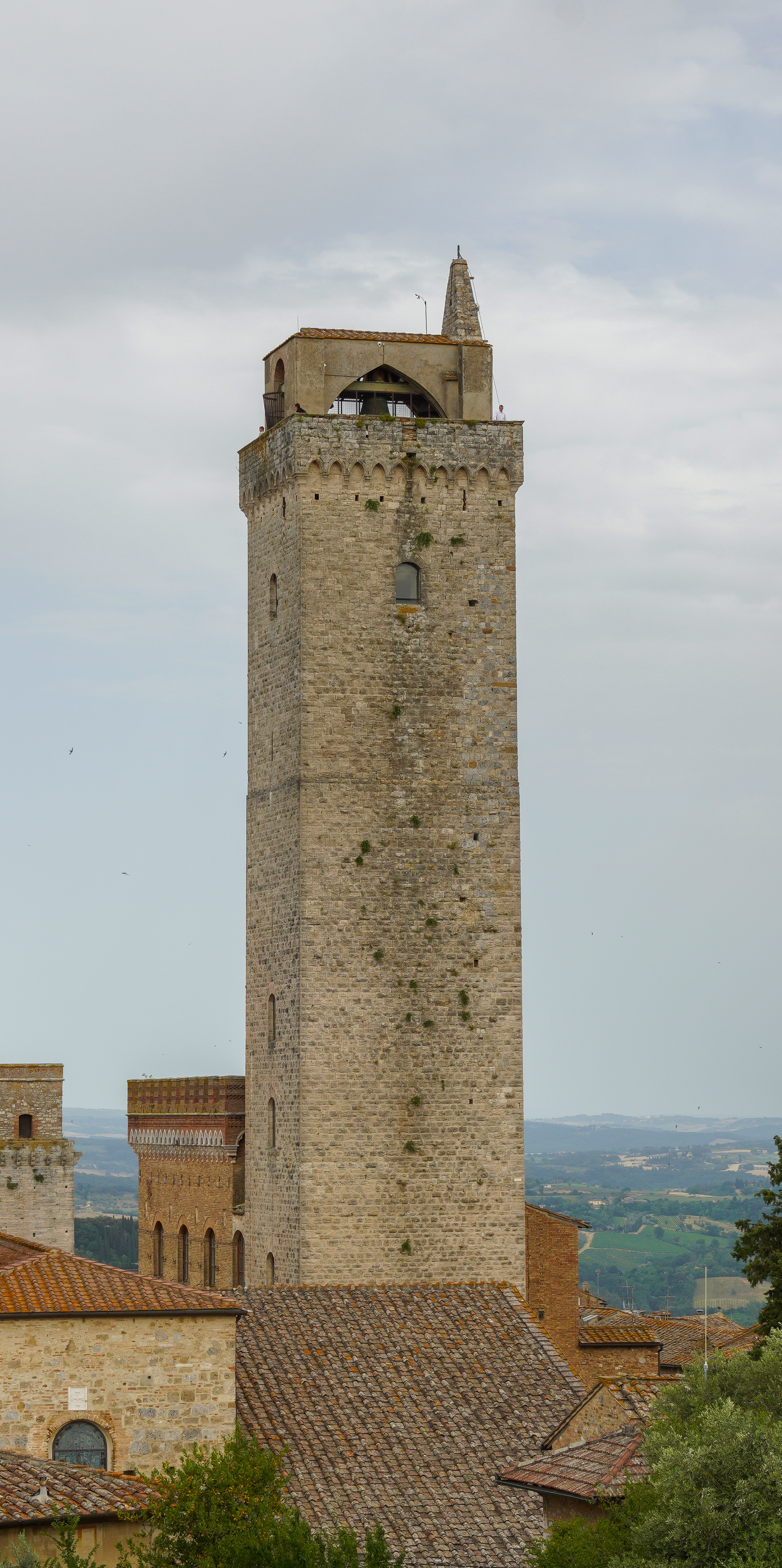
- Torre Grossa and Collegiate Church of San Gimignano in the piazza del Duomo.

General information
- Location: San Gimignano, Toscana, Italy
- Coordinates: 43°28′3.46″N 11°2′34.45″E
- Construction started: 1311
- Owner: Ardinghelli family

Height
- Height: 54 m (177 ft 2 in)

Torre Grossa is the tallest tower in San Gimignano, standing at 54 m (177 ft 2 in) high. It is one of the most iconic and well-known medieval towers in Tuscany. The tower was built in 1310.

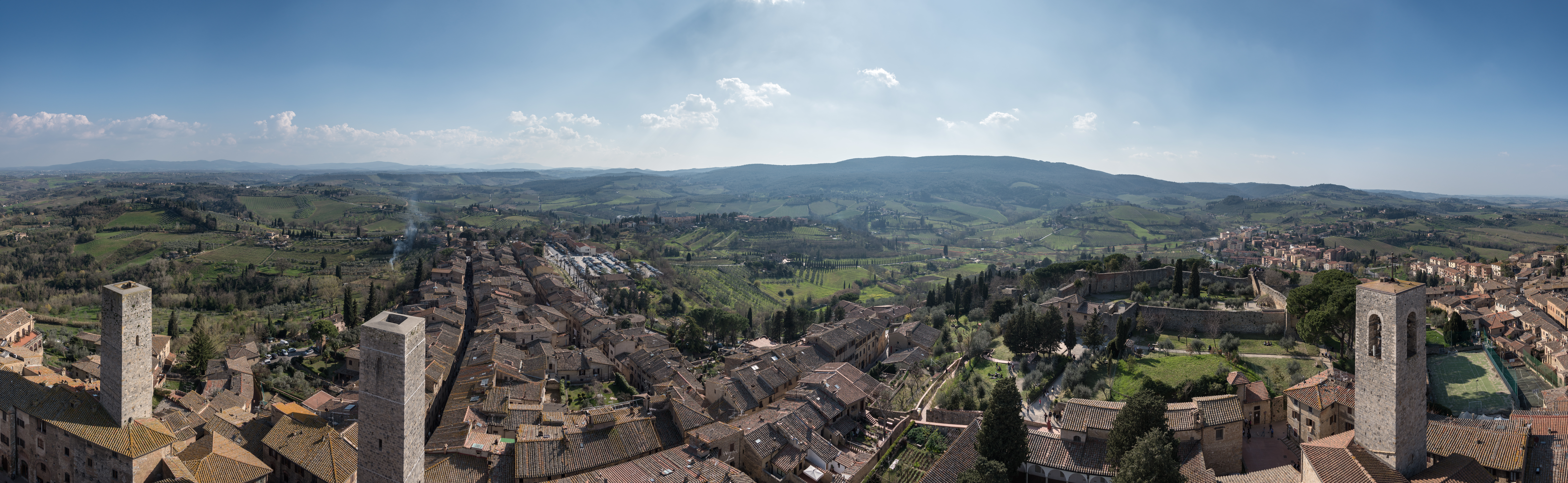
A view of San Gimignano from Torre Grossa

== Bibliography ==
- Lafferty, Samantha (1 December 2011). Turkey Travel Adventures. Hunter Publishing, Inc. p. 645. ISBN 9781588436856.

Media related to Torre Grossa (San Gimignano) at Wikimedia Commons
