= Saint Fina =

Italian saint (1238–1253)

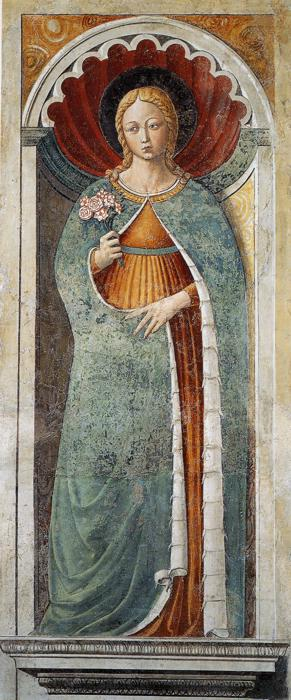
- Fresco of Fina painted by Benozzo Gozzoli

Virgin
- Born: 1238; San Gimignano, Florentine Republic
- Died: 12 March [O.S. 5 March] 1253; San Gimignano, Florentine Republic
- Venerated in: San Gimignano, Italy
- Feast: March 12 and 1st Sunday of August
- Attributes: violets, with Saint Gregory the Great, or lying on her wooden board

Fina (Serafina) (1238–1253) was an Italian Christian virgin who is especially venerated in the Tuscan town of San Gimignano. She developed a paralytic illness and spent the rest of her life on a bed made from a wooden pallet, where, according to legends, Saint Gregory the Great appeared to her to predict her death.

== Life ==
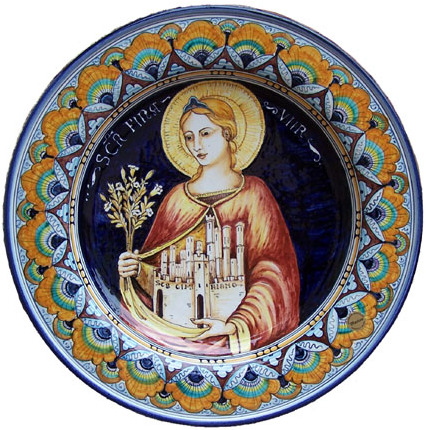
Representation of Saint Fina on a ceramic dish

Fina dei Ciardi was born in San Gimignano in 1238. The daughter of Cambio and Imperiera Ciardi, a declined noble family, she lived in a humble house located in the historic centre of the famous “city of beautiful towers” (today the small road on which her house stands takes her name). There is little record of the first ten years of her life, and what information available comes from legends narrated after her death. She learned to sew and spin, spending most of her time at home. Some accounts note Fina's strong devotion to the Virgin Mary, and that she went out only to hear Mass.

In 1248, Fina contracted a serious illness which progressively left her paralysed. Instead of a bed, she chose to lie on a wooden pallet. Eventually, she developed painful pressure sores. During her illness, she lost her father and later her mother died after a fall. Despite these trials she never complained, but kept a joyful countenance and gave thanks to God.

Fina's immense devotion was an example to all the citizens of San Gimignano, who frequently visited her. Visitors were surprised to receive words of encouragement from a desperately ill young girl who was resigned to the will of God. Fina had a particular devotion to Saint Gregory the Great. On March 4, 1253, after five years of sickness and pain, she allegedly experienced a vision of St. Gregory, wherein he foretold her death. Fina died as predicted on March 12 at the age of 15.

== Legends ==
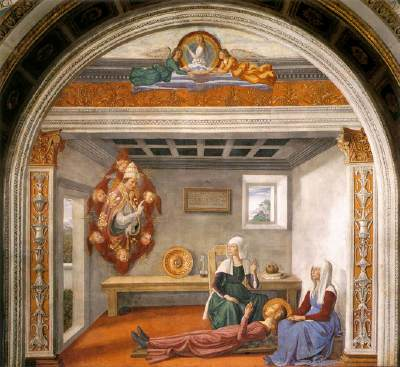
Announcement of Death to Saint Fina by Saint Gregory the Great, by Domenico Ghirlandaio.

Miracles attributed to Fina are mentioned in stories, paintings, poems and in notary documents. Legends say that, at the exact moment of Fina's passing away, all the bells of San Gimignano rang without anyone touching them.

One legend tells that during a walk with two of her friends she heard a young girl, Smeralda, crying. Smeralda had broken a pitcher that her mother had given her in order to fill with water from the public well. While she was entertained by other children, she forgot the pitcher on the ground which unfortunately rolled down and broke. Fina told her to arrange the pieces and put them under the water: the pitcher became whole and full of water.

When Fina's body was removed from the pallet that was her deathbed, onlookers saw white violets bloom from the wood, and smelt a fresh, floral fragrance throughout her house. Violets grow on the walls of San Gimignano. For this reason, the townspeople call them “The Saint Fina violets.”

For several days, pilgrims went to the Pieve to see Fina's remains and during that time there were reports of a number of cures. One concerned her nurse Beldia, whose hand was healed. Many sick people who visited her grave during the following years were said to have experienced cures and some of these became some of Fina's most fervent devotees.

Another anecdote about Fina's miracles is that of the Ciardi family's neighbor. Once on the anniversary of Fina's death, when the townsfolk had declared a holiday in her honor, a neighbor, Cambio di Rustico, went to cut wood and hurt his leg. He asked Fina's pardon and was very sorry for not having respected her memorial. His cut then miraculously disappeared.

== Veneration ==
Miraculous healings were attributed to Fina's intercession. Her feast is celebrated in San Gimignano on both 12 March, the anniversary of her death, and on the first Sunday in August. Her relics are kept in a chapel in the Collegiata di San Gimignano. A hospital in San Gimignano was formerly named in her honor and several paintings of her can be found in the town.

A papal bull issued by Pope Sixtus IV on October 1481, confirmed by Pope Paul III in 1538, permitted the public cult and veneration of Saint Fina. Her feast on 12 March has been a statutory holiday in the town since 1481. The second feast on the first Sunday of August commemorates her stopping two plagues that ravaged the town in 1479 and 1631. On both days, her relics are carried in procession in order to bless the town.

Fina is considered a patroness and protector of the town along with Saint Gimignano.

== Legacy ==
A hospital was built in 1255 thanks to donations given at her tomb and named after her. It became in the following century one of the best in Tuscany, giving hospitality to the old and poor people and pilgrims. The building remained in function until the end of the 20th century. In the hospital's chapel, the original oak wood table where Saint Fina lay down for five years is preserved.

== Iconography and biographies ==
The most important monument dedicated to Saint Fina is her chapel in the Collegiata, designed by Giuliano da Maiano in 1468 and consecrated in 1488. Her relics are located inside the altar built by Giuliano's brother Benedetto da Maiano. On the left and right walls of the Chapel there are two frescoes painted by Domenico Ghirlandaio: one shows the vision of Saint Gregory; the other shows the funeral where the violets in blossom on the towers are represented. Also depicted is an angel ringing the bells, Beldia's cured hand and the self-portrait of the painter and his brother-in-law Mainardi, who painted the chapel's ceiling.

Inside the Civic Museum of San Gimignano there is a wood tabernacle painted by Lorenzo di Niccolò in 1402 depicting Saint Fina holding a model of San Gimignano along with eight scenes of her life and miracles. Another image of Fina is in the nearby church of Sant'Agostino, painted by Benozzo Gozzoli. Other artists depicting the saint's life include Piero del Pollaiuolo and Pier Francesco Fiorentino.

Fra Giovanni del Coppo wrote the earliest hagiography of Saint Fina (“Historia vita et morte di Sancta Fina da San Gimignano”, written on 14th century and translated from Latin by Jacopo Manducci in 1575). Many others have tried to tell Saint Fina's life (Enrico Castaldi, Giovanni Bollando, Filippo Buonaccorsi, Teodoro Ferroni, Ignazio Malenotti, Luigi Pecori, Ugo Nomi Veronesi Pesciolini, and Enrico Fiumi).

== See also ==
- Santa Fina Chapel
- Saint Fina, patron saint archive

== Sources ==
- Vichi, Iole Imberciadori. Fina dei Ciardi (1979)
