= Da Maiano =

da Maiano is the name of two Italian Renaissance brothers who worked as sculptors and architects:

- Giuliano da Maiano (c. 1432-1490)
- Benedetto da Maiano (1442-1497)
