= Santa Fina Chapel =

Chapel in San Gimignano, Italy

Coordinates: 43°28′4.66″N 11°2′33.59″E

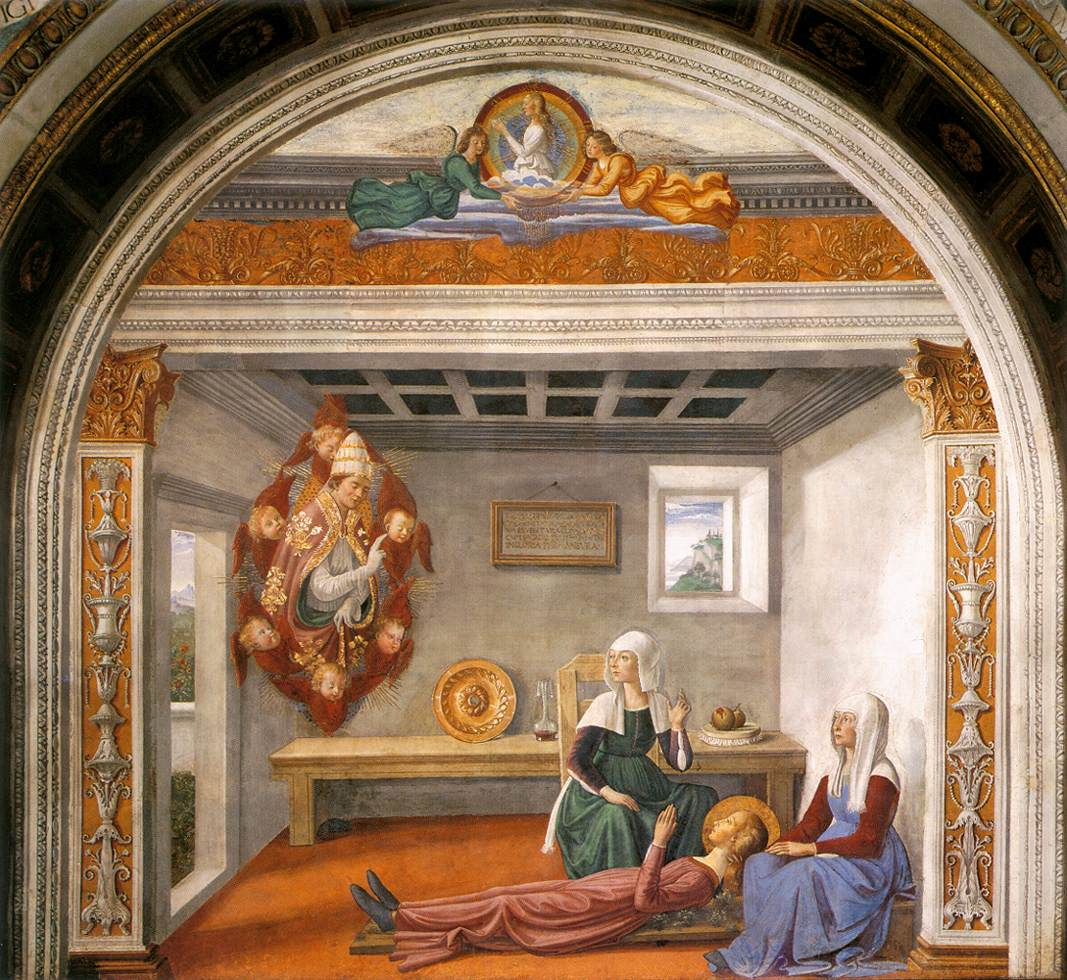
Announcement of Death to St Fina by Domenico Ghirlandaio, one of the Renaissance frescoes in the chapel

The Saint Fina Chapel (Italian: Cappella di Santa Fina) is an Early Renaissance chapel in the right aisle of the Collegiate church of Santa Maria Assunta, located in San Gimignano, Tuscany, Italy. It was designed by Giuliano and Benedetto da Maiano in 1468 to enshrine the relics of Saint Fina. The side walls of the chapel are painted in fresco by Domenico Ghirlandaio with two scenes from her life, executed between 1477 and 1478.

== History ==
After her death on 12 March 1253 the veneration of Fina dei Ciardi quickly grew to become the protector and saint patron of the city of San Gimignano. Her burial place, now close to the door of the sacristy, lay at that time in a small cloister, adjacent to the cemetery. In 1325 the commune of San Gimignano approved the erection of an altar within the church to contain her relics.

In 1457 the city decided to build "a beautiful and honourable" chapel dedicated to Santa Fina to enshrine her relics. Works proceeded slowly until Giuliano da Maiano was summoned from Florence in 1468 to furnish the commune with a suitable design for the chapel. Giuliano was paid the sum of 11 lire 6 soldi.

A papal bull issued by Pope Sixtus IV on October 1481, confirmed by Pope Paul III in 1538, permitted the public cult and veneration of Saint Fina as one of the saints of the Catholic Church. The chapel was consecrated by the Bishop of Pistoia on 4 October 1488.

== Architecture ==
The architecture, completed in 1472, is inspired by Antonio Rossellino's Cardinal of Portugal Chapel in the basilica of San Miniato al Monte in Florence. It is one bay deep, each wall being defined by an arched recess. The arches support an entablature decorated by a color terracotta frieze with seraphim. Above the entablature are lunettes which include circular windows.

The altar housing the saint's relics is a work by Benedetto da Maiano (1475) that bears relief scenes of Saint Fina's life. Above the altar is a tabernacle with a portrait of her on leather, an early 14th-century work by the Sienese Manno di Bandino. The urn on the tabernacle held the saint's bones until 1738. The upper lunette is decorated by a painting of the Madonna with Child between Two Angels. Around the side walls are stalls of carved and inlaid wood, by Antonio da Colle. The ceiling was adorned by Sebastiano Mainardi, Ghirlandaio's brother-in-law and master, with figures of the Evangelists and Doctors of the Church.

The chapel was enclosed with a marble balustrade in 1661.

== Ghirlandaio frescoes ==
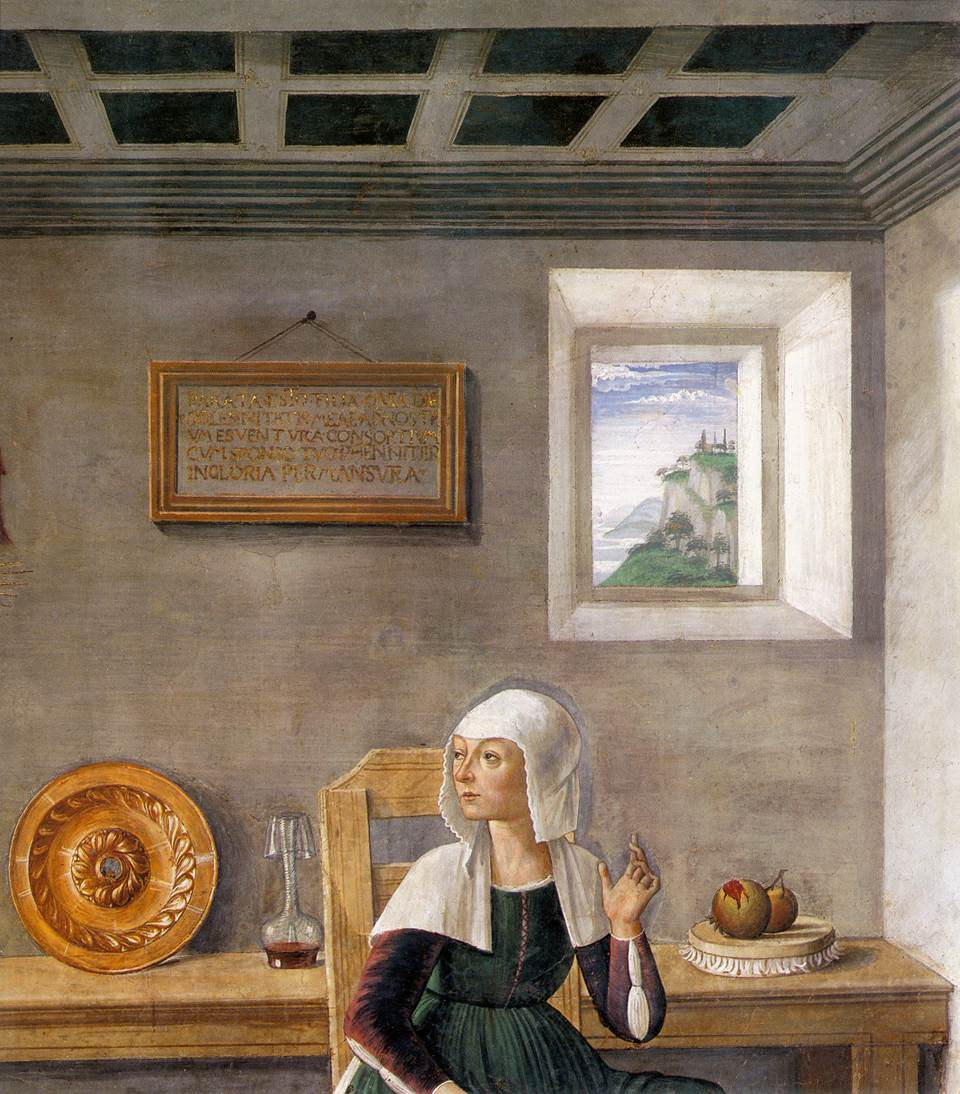
Detail of the Announcement.

The side walls of the chapel were frescoed by the Florentine painter Domenico Ghirlandaio between late 1477 and September 1478, at the same time as Benedetto da Maiano was working on the sculpture.

An inscription on the tomb by the latter alludes to their simultaneous presence in 1475. Upon the sarcophagus decorated with naked genii runs the inscription attributed to Giovanni Battista Cantalicio, the author of laudatory verses in honour of the Saint Gregory printed in Venice in 1493:

VIRGINIS OSSA LATENT TUMULO, QUEM SUSPICIS, HOSPES; HAEC DEEUS, EXEMPLUM, PRAESIDIUMQUE SUIS. NOMEN FINA FUIT, PATRIA HAEC; MIRACULA QUAERIS? PERLEGE QUAE PARIES, VIVAQUE SIGNA DOCENT. MCCCCLXXV"

— The bones of a Virgin lie hidden in the tomb which you behold, stranger; she is the glory, the example, the guardian of her fellow-citizens. Her name was Fina; this (is) her native land. Seeking for miracles? Observe what the wall and vivid images teach. MCCCCLXXV

However, although it has been argued that the last line of the epitaph proves that Ghirlandaio painted the frescoes not later than 1475, this is not conclusive, as the subject and the composition had probably been settled from the beginning. Entries exist in the ledger of the works of the collegiate church of certain sums of money paid to Benedetto da Maiano for the epitaph of Santa Fina, under the dates of 29 May 1490 and 13 December 1493.

The frescoes are Ghirlandaio's first known major commission, and show the first traces of his mature style. According to Saint Fina's hagiography, she had devoted her late life to a mystic devotion, which eventually led her to paraplegia. One day St. Gregory appeared to her to announce that she would be soon liberated by the illness in exchange for external life. On the day of her funeral, several miraculous events occurred, including the healing of her nurse, who suffered paralysis in her hand.

The fresco on right wall of the chapel depicts, in the main field, St. Gregory the Great, supported by red-winged cherubim, appearing to Santa Fina to announce her death. Saint Fina, flanked by her nurses Beldia and Bonaventura, is praying while lying on a wooden plank. According to the legend, when she died the palette became covered with violets, which are typical March flowers at San Gimignano. The scene is a domestic interior with white-washed walls and a coffered ceiling. It is characterized by bright colours. The room is painted using geometrical perspective, and has a door which opens on a garden with rose bushes and a window through which can be seen a distant citadel. A rat under the bench in the background is a reference to Saint Fina's martyrdom (she was eaten alive by rats and worms). The other objects also have a symbolic meaning: the pomegranate is a symbol of royalty, fertility, resurrection and unity of the Church; the apple is a symbol of original sin; the wine refers to the Eucharist sacrament. The finely wrought platter is perhaps an autobiographic element, as Ghirlandaio's father was a goldsmith, and the artist had also received training in that art. The elaborate architectonic elements which frame the scene became a feature in numerous later works by Ghirlandaio.

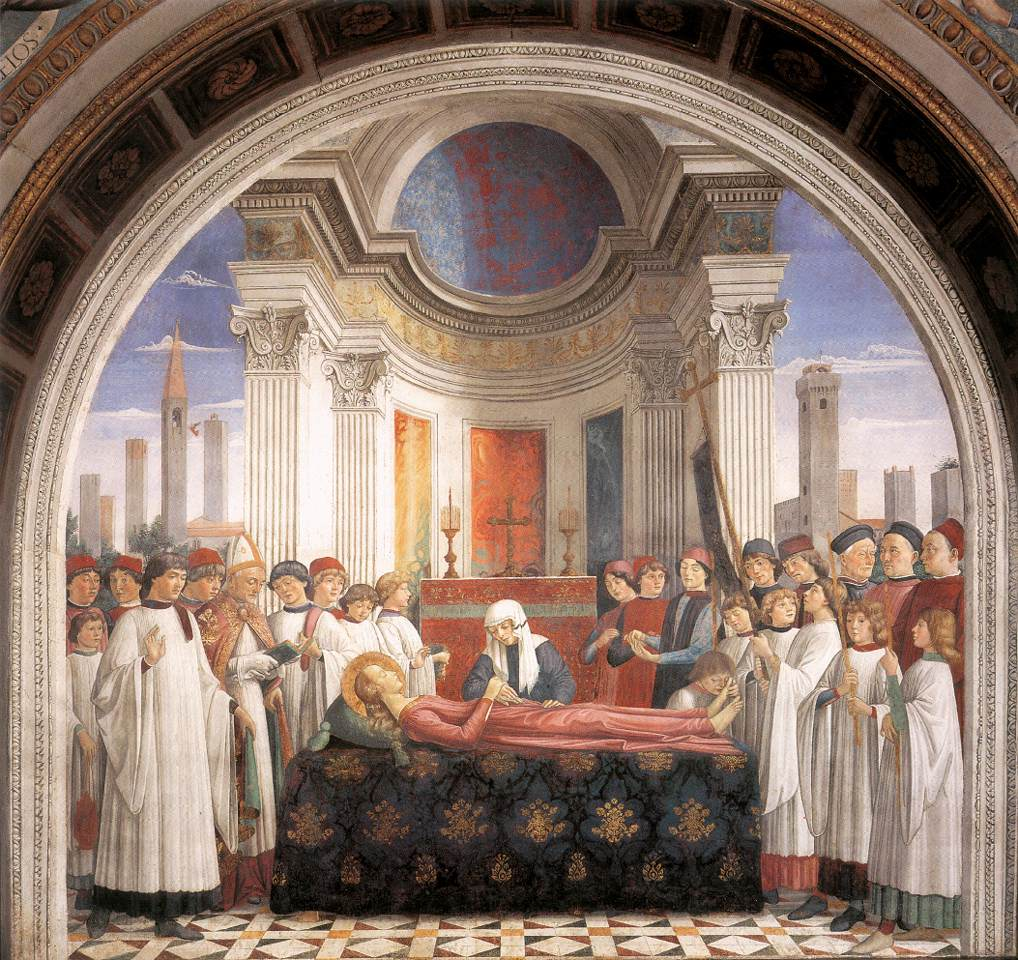
The Funeral of Saint Fina.

On the wall of the painted room is a slab with an inscription in gold lettering of the following words by St. Gregory:

PARATA ESTO, FILIA, QUIA DIE SOLEMNITATIS MEAE AD NOSTRUM ES VENTURA CONSORTIUM, CUM SPONSO TUO PERENNITER IN GLORIA PERMANSURA

— Be ready, my daughter, because on my Feast Day you will rise to heaven, where you will live eternally with your bridegroom

Above a painted architrave at the top of the picture a small image shows two angels transporting the soul of the praying woman within an aureola.

The scene on the left wall portrays the Funeral of Saint Fina. The saint is on her funeral bier, lying on a richly decorated brocade cloth, her head supported on a pillow. The scene is set in front of Renaissance exedra around the altar, decorated with precious marble, grooved pillars and composite capitals, supporting a rich entablature and a blue semi-dome. Behind the saint is her old nurse Beldia, who kneels as Saint Fina's hand touches hers, bringing about the miracle which healed her from paralysis. A second miracle is represented by the crying boy who is touching her toes, and will gain back his sight. A third miracle, that the bells of San Gimignano's towers were rung by angels, is suggested by a flying putto near one of the towers depicted in the background. The Torre Grossa, the town's tallest, is visible on the right. The painting also features Ghirlandaio's first true-life portraits, with gestures and face expressions familiar from daily life. The citizens depicted in the painting probably include the work's donors.

The four pendentives that support the vault are decorated by the figures of prophets, while the lunettes feature Saints Ambrose, Nicholas, Jerome, Gimignano and Augustine, by Sebastiano Mainardi. The vault, finally, has the Four Evangelists, also by Mainardi.

The style of this scheme, combining elements that are both historic and contemporary, was perhaps inspired by Filippo Lippi's Stories of St. Stephen and St. John the Baptist in the Prato Cathedral, and was later used by Ghirlandaio in the frescoes of the Sassetti Chapel in the basilica of Santa Trinita at Florence.

== Sources ==
- Mansfield, Mildred (1908) [1598]. Fra Giovanni Coppo — The Legend of the Holy Fina, Virgin of Santo Gemignano. New York: Duffield & Co.
- Gardner, Edmund G. (1902). "In the town of the beautiful towers". The story of Siena and San Gimignano. London: J.M. Dent & co. pp. 344–365.
- Koch, Linda A. (1998). "The Portrayal of Female Sainthood in Renaissance San Gimignano: Ghirlandaio's Frescoes of Santa Fina's Legend". Artibus et Historiae. 19 (38): 143–170. doi:10.2307/1483589. JSTOR 1483589?.
- Pecori, Luigi (1853). Storia della terra di San Gimignano (in Italian). Florence: Tipografia Galileiana. p. 3.
- Hauvette, Henri (1908). Ghirlandaio (in French). Paris: Plon.
- Quermann, Andreas (1998). Ghirlandaio. Cologne: Könemann. ISBN 978-3-8290-0248-6.
- Webber, F. R. (2003). Church symbolism : an explanation of the more important symbols of the Old and New Testament, the primitive, the mediaeval and the modern church. Whitefish, MT: Kessinger Publishing. ISBN 978-0-7661-4009-7.
- Sill, Gertrude Grace (1976). A handbook of symbols in Christian art. London: Cassell. ISBN 978-0-304-29678-1.
