= Maiano =

Coordinates: 43.7938°N 11.3041°E

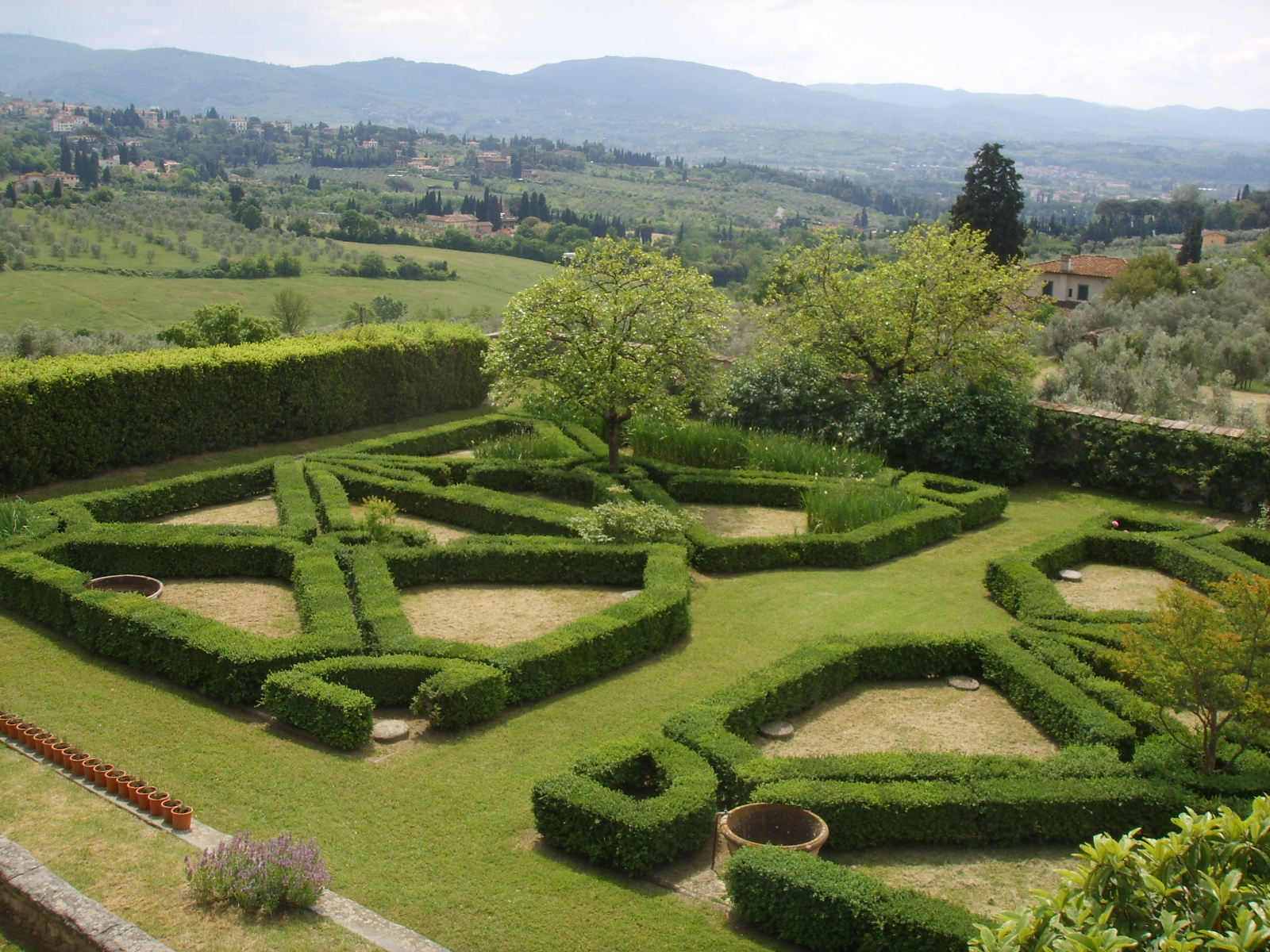
Gardens of the villa at Maiano

Maiano is small hilltop locality, now part of Fiesole, in Tuscany.

The Chiesa di San Martino was founded there in the eleventh century and subsequently restored in the fifteenth, nineteenth, and twentieth centuries. A palagio existed at Maiano in the Middle Ages, but in 1467 it was destroyed in a storm. It was rebuilt as the Villa di Maiano which today still dominates the Fattoria di Maiano estate. In the thirteenth century the poet Dante da Maiano was born there, though he was active in Florence. The family of Renaissance sculptors Giuliano da Maiano, Benedetto, and Giovanni da Maiano moved from Maiano to Florence in the fourteenth century.
