= Santa Maria delle Grazie, Arezzo =

Church in Arezzo, Italy

Coordinates: 43.4506°N 11.8829°E

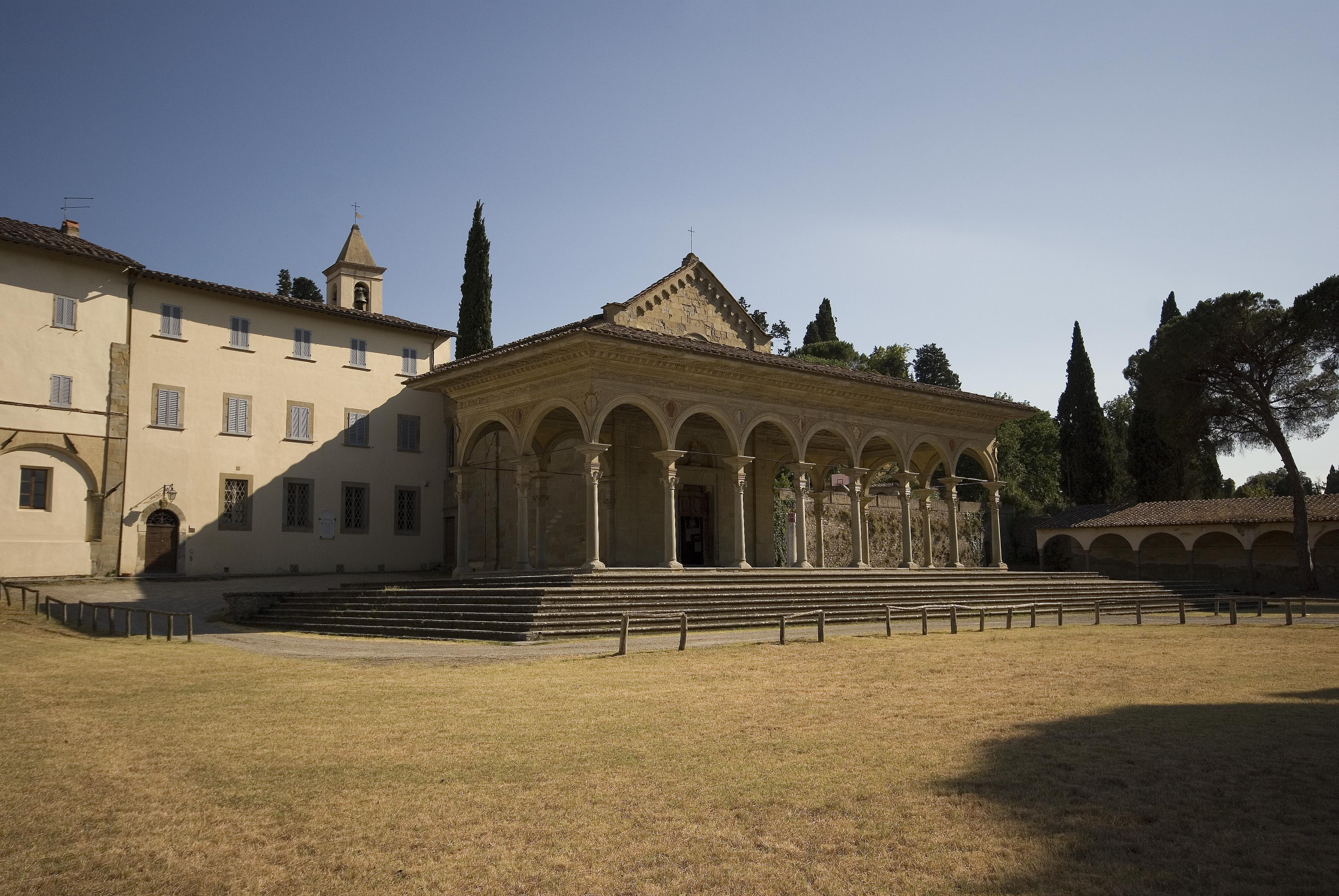
Santa Maria delle Grazie.

Santa Maria delle Grazie is a church in Arezzo, Tuscany, central Italy.

It is located on the site of an ancient sanctuary with a spring that, in the Etruscan-Roman era, it was consecrated to Apollo. In the Middle Ages it was known as Fonte Tecta.

In 1425, Saint Bernardino of Siena tried in vain to have it destroyed. Ousted from the city, he returned in 1428 and, this time, he was able to obtain the replacement of the spring with an oratory. Here, from 1428 and 1431, Parri di Spinello, son of Spinello Aretino, painted a fresco with the Madonna of Misericordia, now inserted in the marble altar by Andrea Della Robbia (1487–1493). The altar portrays, in the tympanum, a Madonna with Child between two Angels; in the niches are the saints Laurentinus, Pergentinus, Donatus and Bernardino, while the paliotto has a Pietà.

Around 1490, the oratory received a portico, designed by Benedetto da Maiano. The structure was inspired by Filippo Brunelleschi's Ospedale degli Innocenti. On the longest side it has seven arcades with medallions, on a basement with steps.

The church itself was built from 1435 to 1444, a late Gothic edifice designed by Domenico del Fattore, with a single nave with cross-vaults and a short apse. It houses a fresco (c. 1477–1481) with Pope Sixtus IV Enthroned between cardinals Gonzaga and Piccolomini. At the right side, a chapel dedicated to Saint Bernardino was built after his death in 1444.
