= Benedetto da Maiano =

Italian sculptor

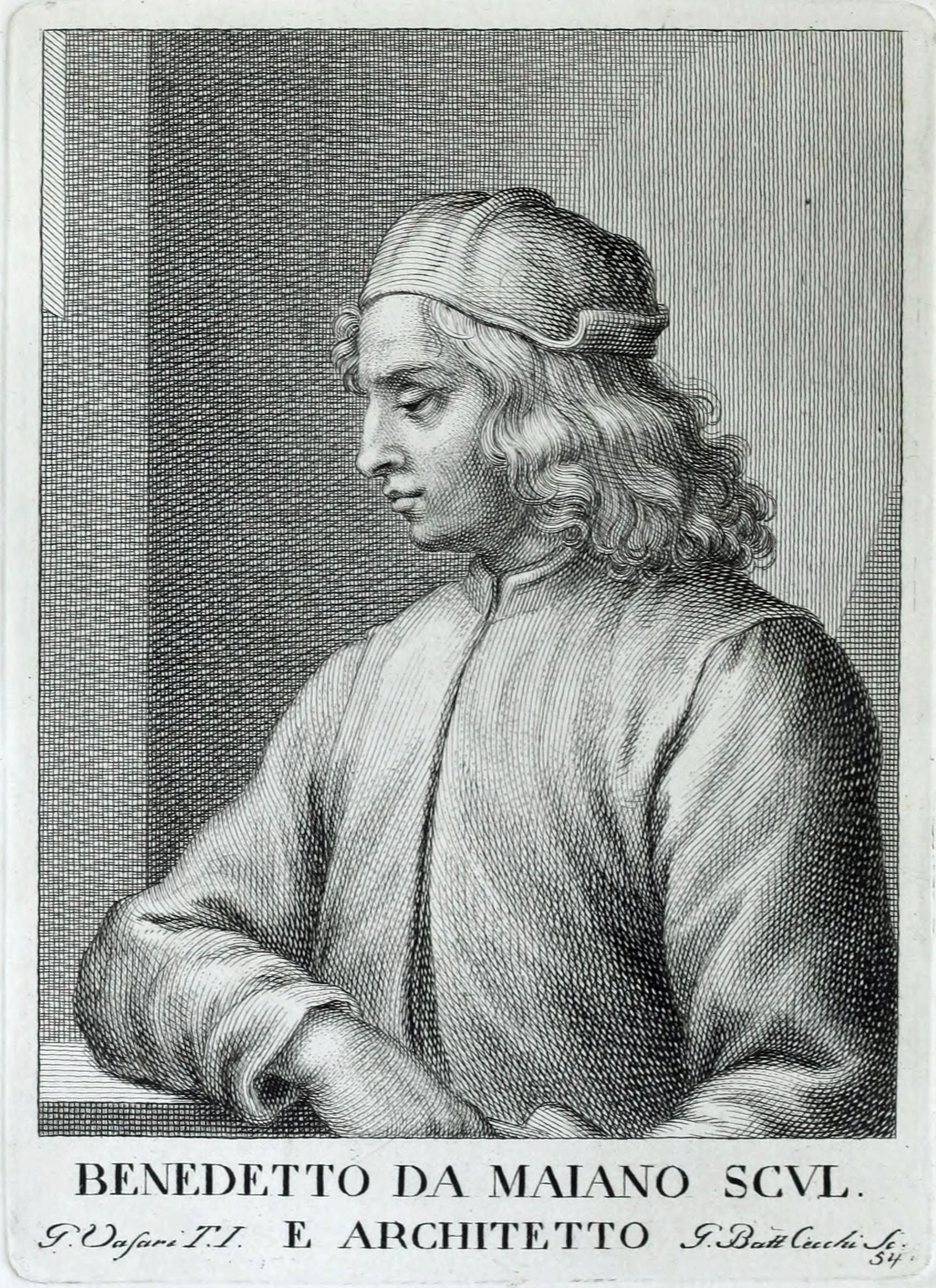
Benedetto da Maiano

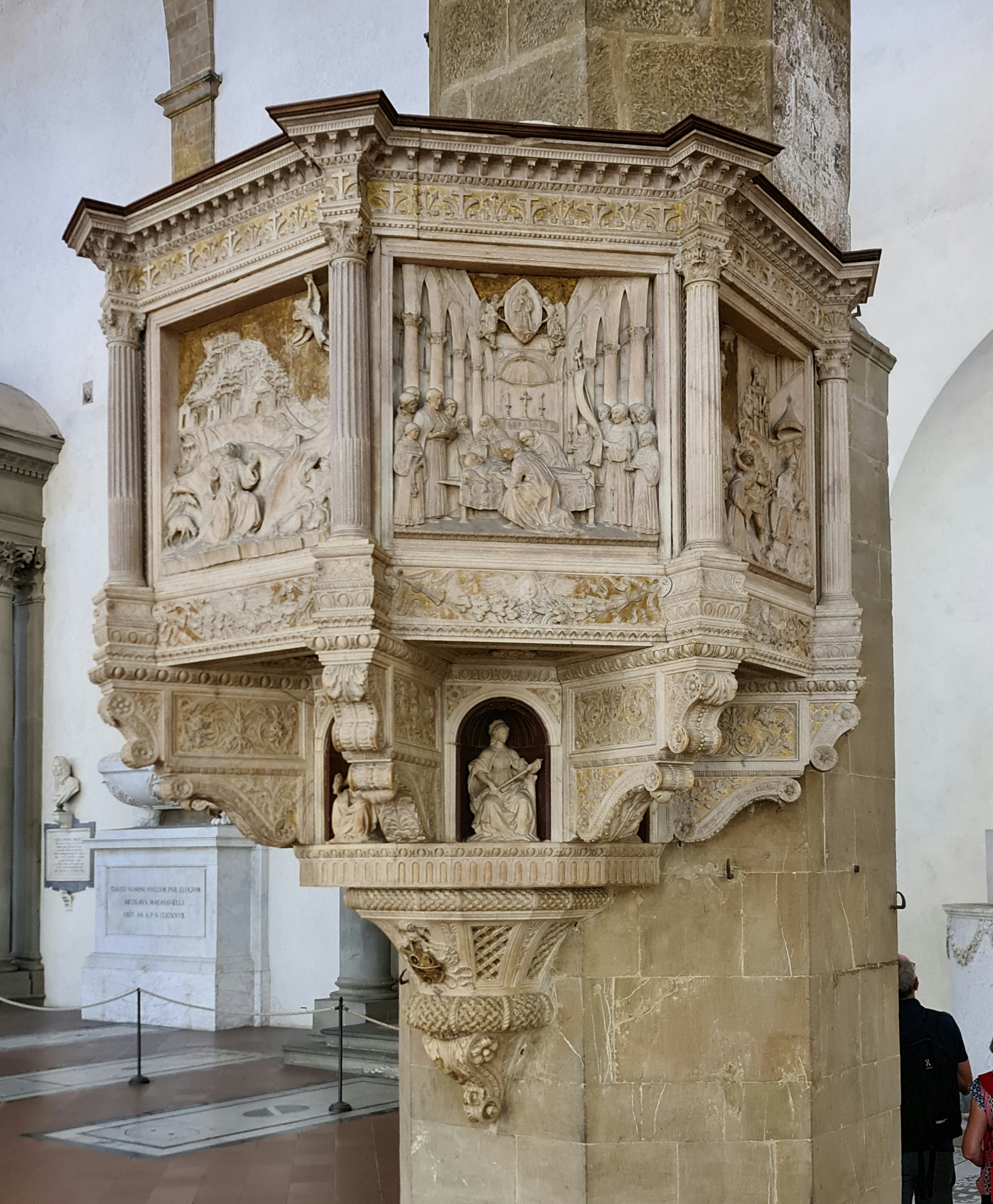
Pulpit of Santa Croce in Florence

Benedetto da Maiano (1442 – 24 May 1497) was an Italian Early Renaissance sculptor.

== Biography ==
Born in the village of Maiano (now part of Fiesole), he started his career as a companion of his brother, the architect Giuliano da Maiano. When he reached the age of thirty he started training under the sculptor Antonio Rossellino. There he learned to work with marble and eventually became more famous than Rossellino and one of the most important sculptors of the 15th century. During his early life, he specialised in wood-mosaic, with the Studiolo of Federico da Montefeltro and other works. King Matthias Corvinus of Hungary invited him to his court, and it is said that the destruction on the journey of some inlay work he was taking to his royal patron made him decide to seek more durable material.

His early attributed works include a shrine dedicated to San Savino for the cathedral of Faenza. Although he was more prolific in sculpting religious subjects, he also carved some portraits of important Florentines; for instance, in 1474, the bust of Pietro Mellini in the Bargello.

In 1475, he worked with his brother Giuliano on the Collegiata church in San Gimignano. Benedetto's most important contribution was the carved altar in the chapel of Santa Fina.

In 1480, he made the framework of the doorway of the Palazzo Vecchio in Florence. The marble pulpit in the Santa Croce in Florence is considered his masterpiece. On the pulpit are scenes from the life of St. Francis of Assisi. Also in 1480, with his brother Giuliano, he built and made the sculptures for the little oratory of the Madonna dell'Olivo, outside Prato. The adolescent St. John of the Bargello is ascribed to the year 1481.

In 1489 Benedetto designed the Strozzi Palace in Florence which still stands (continued by Cronaca). It is believed he went to Naples in 1490, and there finished the works begun by Rossellino in the Sant'Anna church. He also executed various sculptures in Naples, among them an Annunciation at the church of Monte Oliveto. As an architect, he created the tomb of Filippo Strozzi, with its roundel of Mother and Child supported by cherubs in the church of Santa Maria Novella in Florence, and the portico of Santa Maria delle Grazie in Arezzo. He died in Florence at the age of 55.

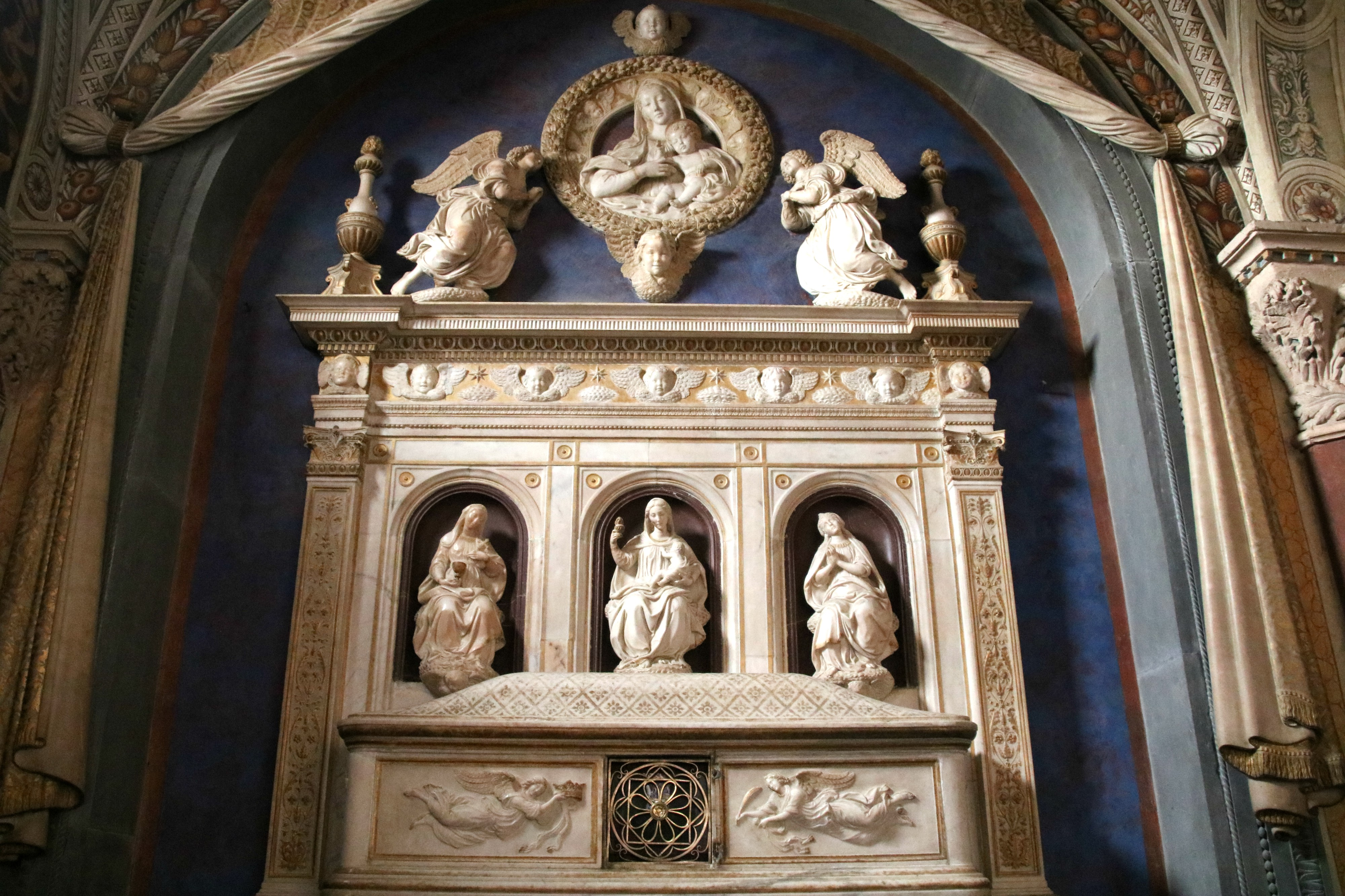
Altarpiece in the Cappella di San Bartolo, Church of Sant'Agostino, San Gimignano

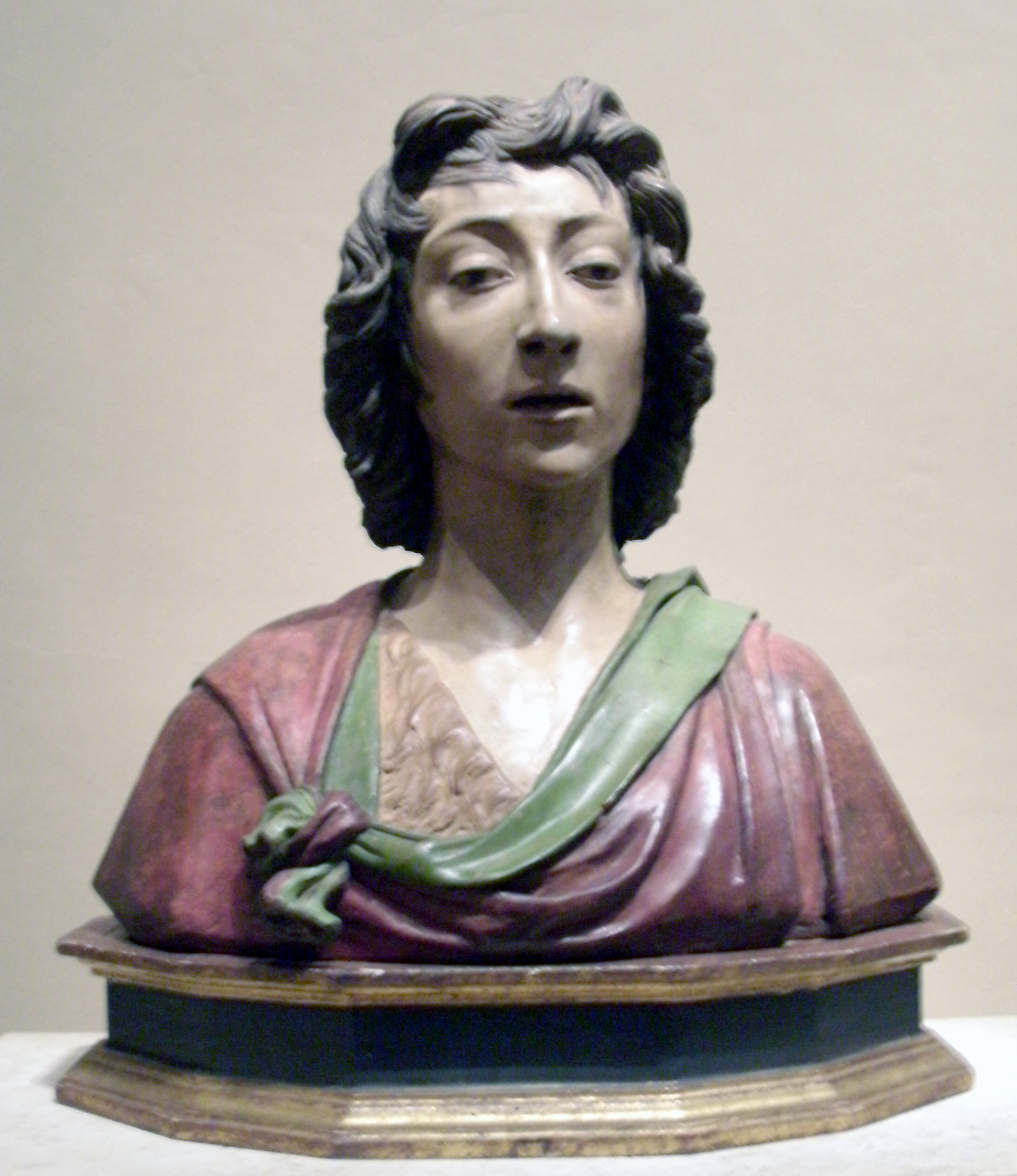
St. John the Baptist, polychrome terracotta, c. 1480, National Gallery of Art, Washington

== See also ==
- Master of the Marble Madonnas
