= Giuliano da Maiano =

Italian sculptor

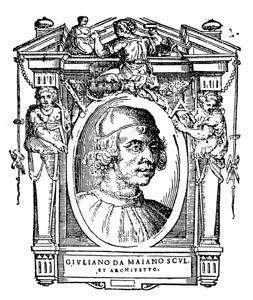
Portrait of Giuliano da Maiano from Vasari's Lives.

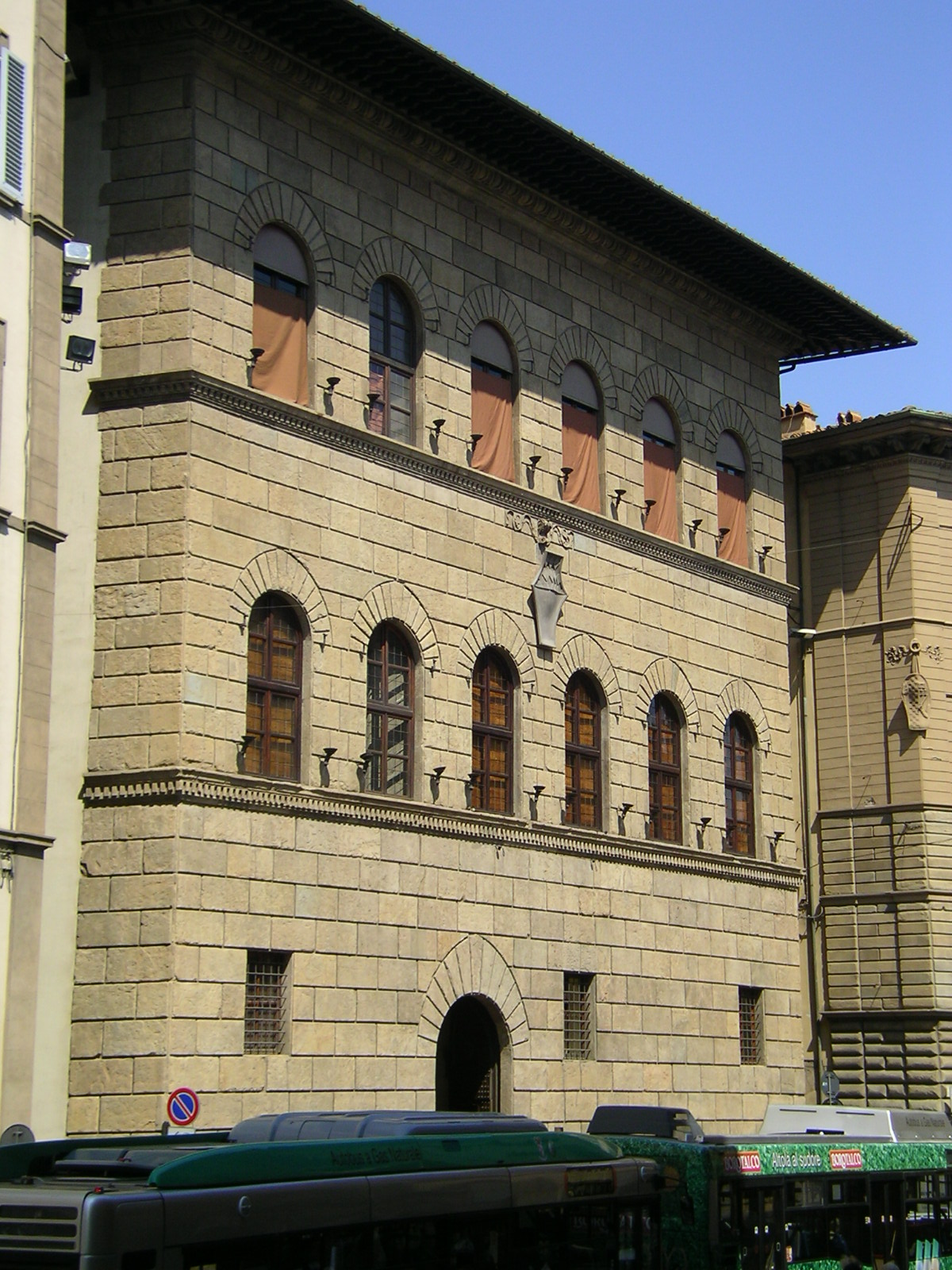
Palazzo Antinori.

Giuliano da Maiano (1432–1490) was an Italian architect, intarsia-worker, and sculptor, the elder brother of Benedetto da Maiano, with whom he often collaborated.

== Biography ==
He was born in the village of Maiano, near Fiesole, where his father was a stone-cutter who moved his family and business to Florence, where, according to Vasari, he operated a stonemason's yard, providing mouldings and carved stone detail for construction. Giuliano showed early promise, and his father hoped at first to make of him a notary, but his talent for sculpture and design won out. His first designs were for the intarsia inlay in the fittings for the New Sacristy of the Duomo, Florence, carried out in collaboration with Benedetto in 1463-1465, where Giuliano carved the wooden bas-reliefs of putti and garlands in the frieze, and for works in Palazzo Vecchio in collaboration with Benedetto, notably the ceiling in octagonal compartments and the white marble doorcase in Benedetto's Sala d'Audienza intarsia in the Sala dei Dugento (1472–1477) and in the Sala del Giglio. In 1480 he finished a tabernacle of the Madonna dell'Olivo for the Cathedral of Prato, executed in collaboration with his brothers Benedetto and Giovanni.

As an architect he was virtually the house architect for the Pazzi, rebuilding Palazzo Pazzi (1462–1472), the main seat of the family, for Jacopo de' Pazzi. For the Strozzi, at the Palazzo dello Strozzino he added a piano nobile (c. 1456) in the manner of Palazzo Medici-Riccardi to a ground floor that had been begun by Michelozzo; he is also often credited with Palazzo Antinori (1465–1469). In Siena, he built Palazzo Spannocchieschi (c. 1475), in the Florentine manner of delicately rusticated facade and twinned arch-headed windows within a blind arch that had been established in Florence by Alberti's Palazzo Rucellai and Michelozzo's Palazzo Medici-Riccardi. Between the two cities, at San Gimignano, Giuliano is credited with enlarging the Romanesque church of Santa Maria and building the chapel of Santa Fina, in collaboration with Benedetto; at Arezzo, where Benedetto built the Portico of Santa Maria delle Grazie, Giuliano built the cloister of the Badia.

The Badia of Fiesole influenced the design of the Brunellesque church of Santa Maria del Sasso, outside Bibbiena, built in 1486-87, where documents show craftsmen were presenting their bills to Giuliano for countersigning. The monks of San Marco were in charge, but the patron was a Medici, for stemme for the church were being painted even as construction progressed; doubtless it was Lorenzo de' Medici himself who paid the expenses. The rock for which the church is named, site of an apparition of the Virgin Mary, rises through the floor at the domed crossing, where Giuliano's delicate domed baldachin identifies and protects the sanctified spot.

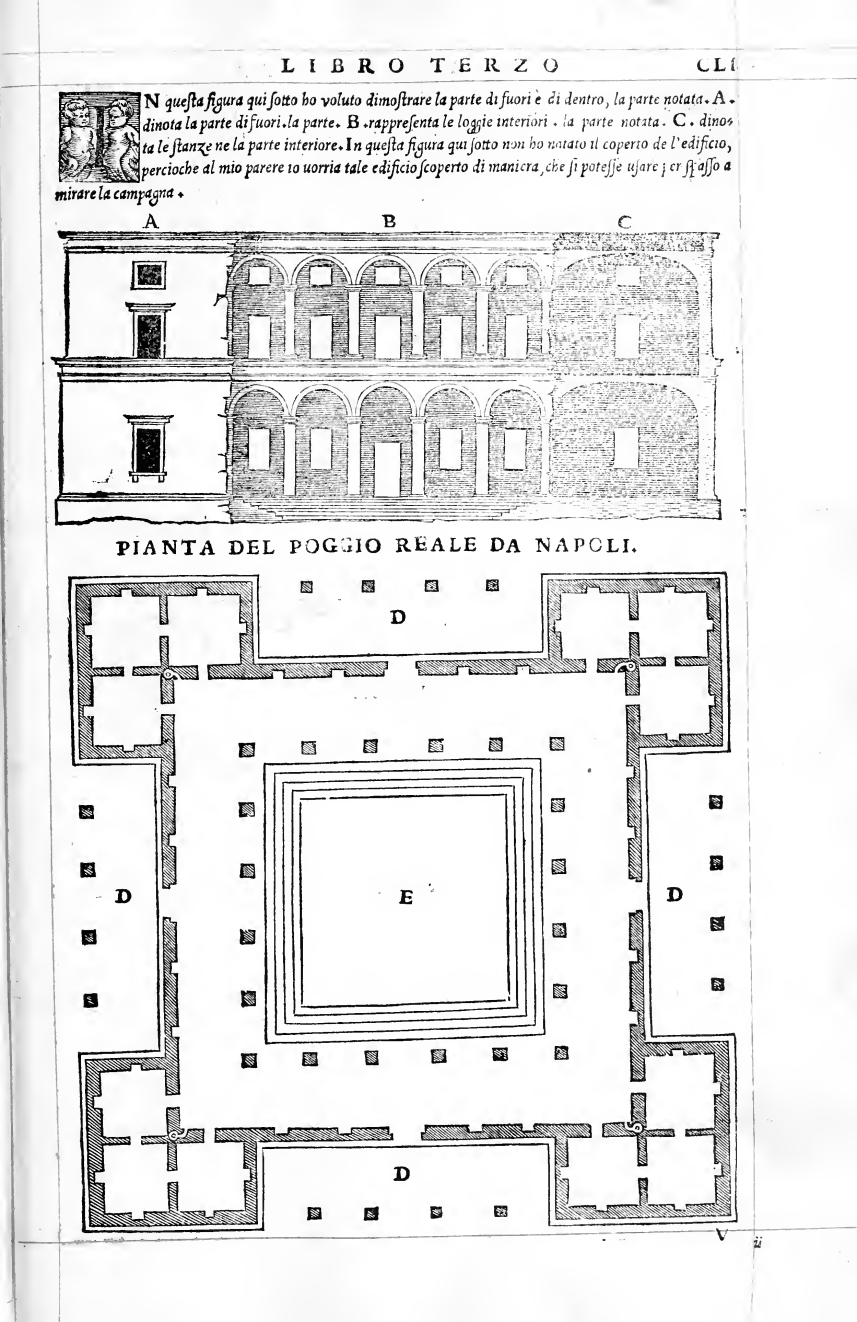
Plan of the Villa Poggio Reale

His established reputation elicited commissions in Rome, Loreto (Basilica della Casa Santa), Faenza (at the cathedral, 1474–1486), in Recanati, where Lorenzo sent him to build Palazzo Venier for Cardinal Anton Giacomo Venier, and in other locations in the Marche.

Above all, from 1487 he worked in Naples, where Alfonso, then duca di Calabria, employed him at the Villa di Poggio Reale (1487–1488, demolished). Giuliano also erected the marble Porta Capuana closely flanked by the cylindrical towers of the Castello; it takes the form of a triumphal arch with Corinthian columns and an elaborate sculptural program; in the Sala Grande of the Castello he carved bas-reliefs above the doors, within and without (Vasari).

He died in Naples in 1490, and Alfonso himself supplied mourners for the funeral.

He was also famous for the wooden room entirely of intarsia, the "Studiolo" in the Ducal Palace in Gubbio.

== Sources ==
- Cendali, Lorenzo (1926). Giuliano e Benedetto da Maiano. Sancasciano.
- von Fabriczy, Cornelius (1903). "Giuliano da Maiano". Jahrbuch der Preußischen Kunstsammlungen. 24.
