= Agostino Novello =

Blessed Agostino Novello O.S.A.
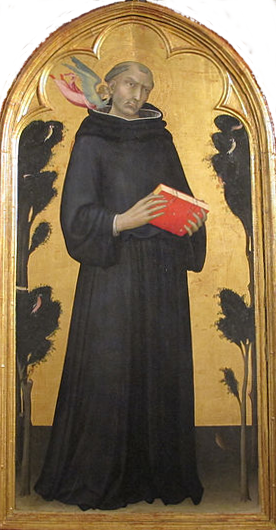
- Agustin Novello - central panel of Simone Martini's Blessed Agostino Novello Triptych

Priest
- Born: Matteo da Termini; 1240; Termini or Tarano
- Died: 19 May 1309 (aged 69); Siena
- Venerated in: Roman Catholic Church
- Beatified: 11 July 1759, Rome by Pope Clement XIII
- Feast: 19 May
- Attributes: Augustinian habit Book "Whispering angel" behind his head

Agostino Novello (1240 – 19 May 1309), also known as Augustine of Tarano, but born Matteo da Termini, was an Italian religious figure. He was born in the first half of the 13th century, at Termini Imerese, the village in Sicily from which he derived his surname. As that village was near Palermo, he is sometimes called Palermitano. The Augustinians believe he was probably born at Tarano (near Rieti and not far north of Rome, Italy). On entering religion, he changed his name to Agostino, and later was given the additional name of Novello.

== Life ==
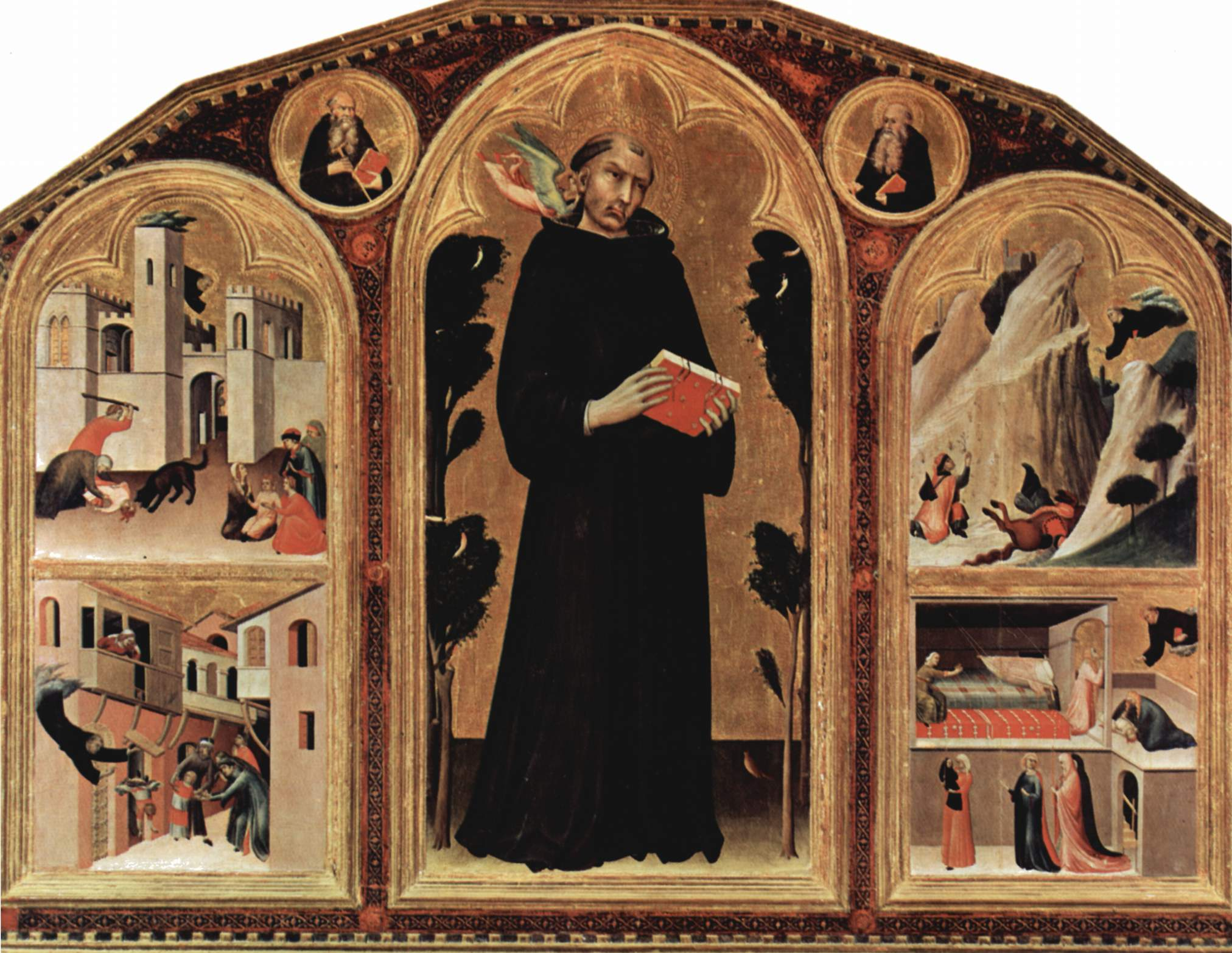
The Simone Martini's Triptych

Matteo's parents, of a noble family originally from Catalonia in Spain, educated him most carefully and had him instructed in all the then-known sciences. At the University of Bologna, he earned a doctorate in civil and canon law, and became a professor of law. He worked in the chancery of the Kingdom of Sicily at the court of King Manfred of Sicily.

In this capacity, Matteo accompanied the King in the war against Charles I of Anjou, who disputed Manfred's right to the crown of Sicily. In the battle at Benevento, in which Manfred was killed and his army routed, Matteo was wounded and thought to be dead, and so was left on the battlefield among the corpses of other soldiers. Regaining consciousness, Matteo was able to reach his home; however, disillusioned with the world and with the evanescence of all earthly glory, he determined thenceforth to forsake all worldly honours and dignities.

Following this decision, Matteo asked for admission as a lay brother into the Order of St. Augustine, and was received in a convent in Sicily. There he took the name Agostino; and there he would live unknown to the world, far from his home and his people, devoted to exercises of piety. He lived there tranquilly until an unforeseen incident brought him once more before the world.

The title to some property belonging to the convent was claimed by a local bishop. The Augustinians were represented by a learned lawyer of Siena, Giacomo Pallares, who recognized Agostino as a former colleague. Pallares lost no time in informing the ecclesiastical authorities of Agostino's identity, advising them to keep no longer in obscurity such a wealth of learning.

When Clement of Osimo, General of the Order, heard of this, he compelled Agostino, under obedience, to receive Holy Orders, and brought him to Rome, where Agostino reformed the Constitutions of the Order, Nicholas IV appointed Agostino his confessor and Grand Penitentiary, a position which he accepted only under obedience. Agostino was elected prior general in 1298. Despite his attempts to refuse this position, he was ordered by the pope to accept. In 1300 he resigned from office and spent the remaining ten years of his life at the hermitage of San Leonardo al Lago.

In his retreat near Siena, Agostino not only dedicated himself to the practice of the virtues proper to the religious state, but also ministered to the people of the surrounding villages as well as in nearby Siena. He was known and respected for his deep humility and love of contemplation. He played an important role in the founding of Siena’s hospital of Santa Maria della Scala and composed a set of guidelines for the hospital community.

== Veneration ==
He died on 19 May 1309/10 at San Leonardo, and his relics, originally preserved in the Church of Saint Augustine, Siena, were later translated to Termini Imerese in Sicily, where his statue is found on the façade of the cathedral. Clement XIII authorized his cult on 11 July 1759.

=== Iconography ===
Agostino is traditionally depicted with a "whispering angel" behind his head, representing divine inspiration. Simone Martini, an Italian painter, made a Triptych on him.

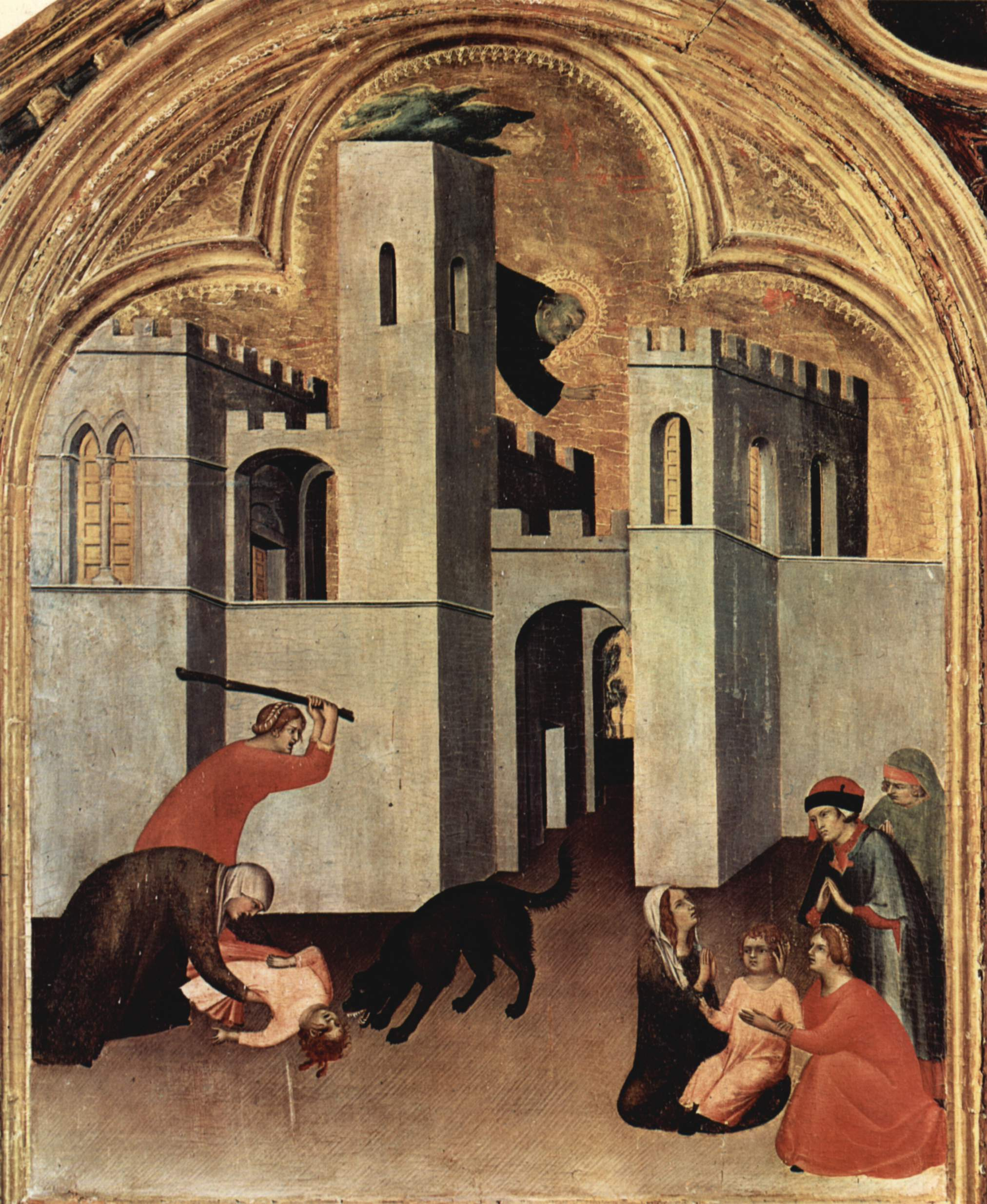
Rescuing a child from the wolf

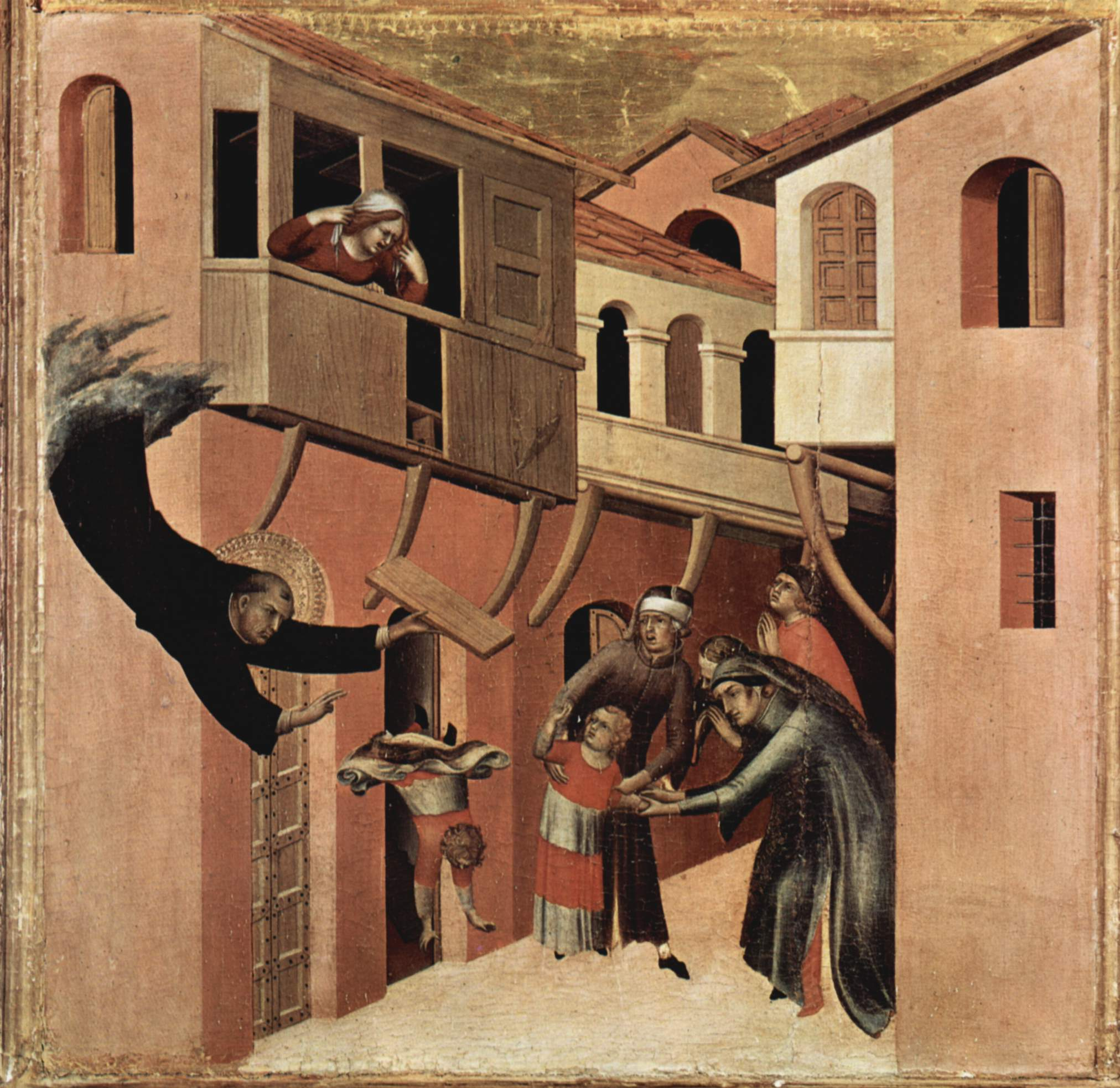
Rescuing a falling child from the loggia

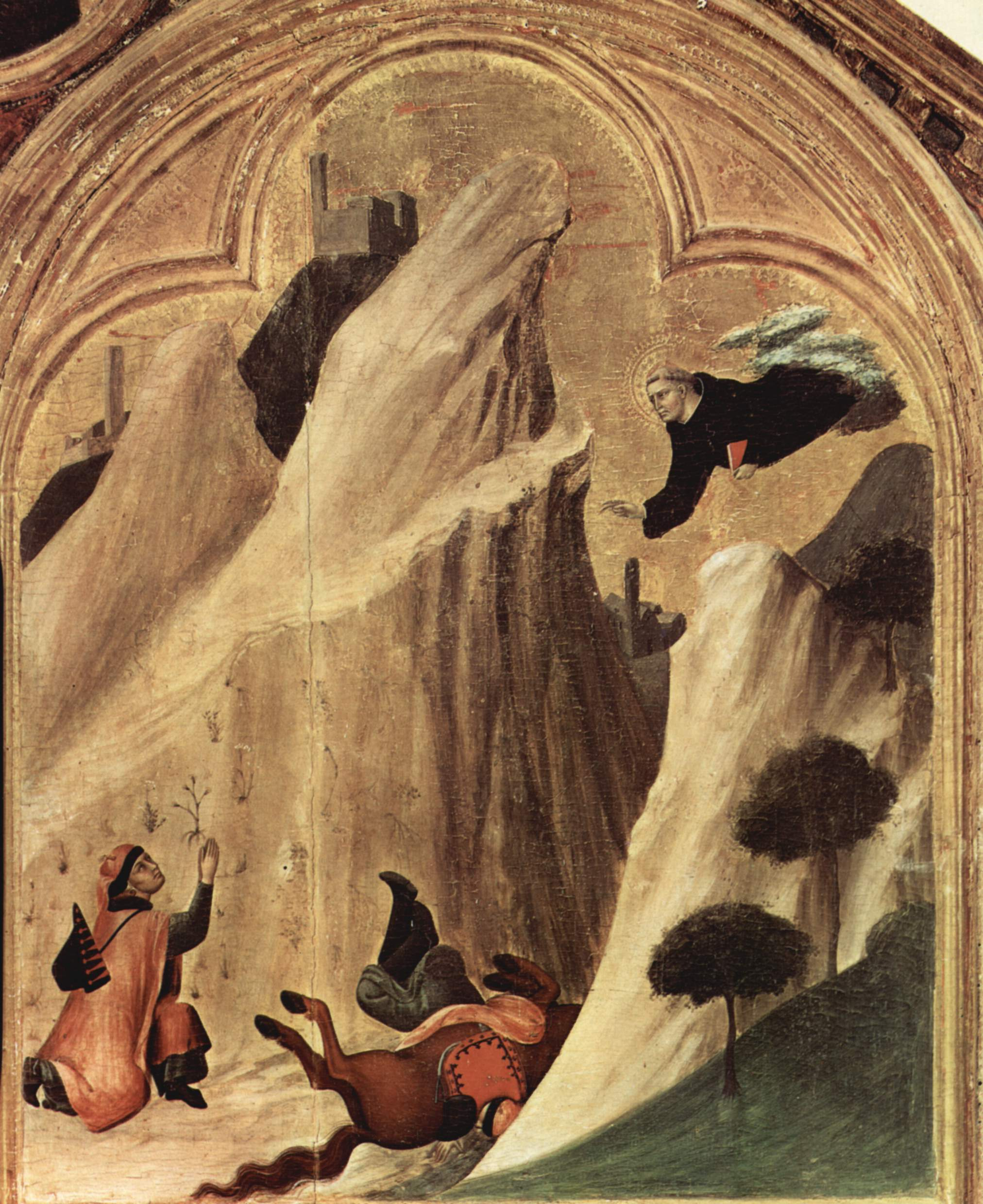
Rescuing a knight trapped in a ravine

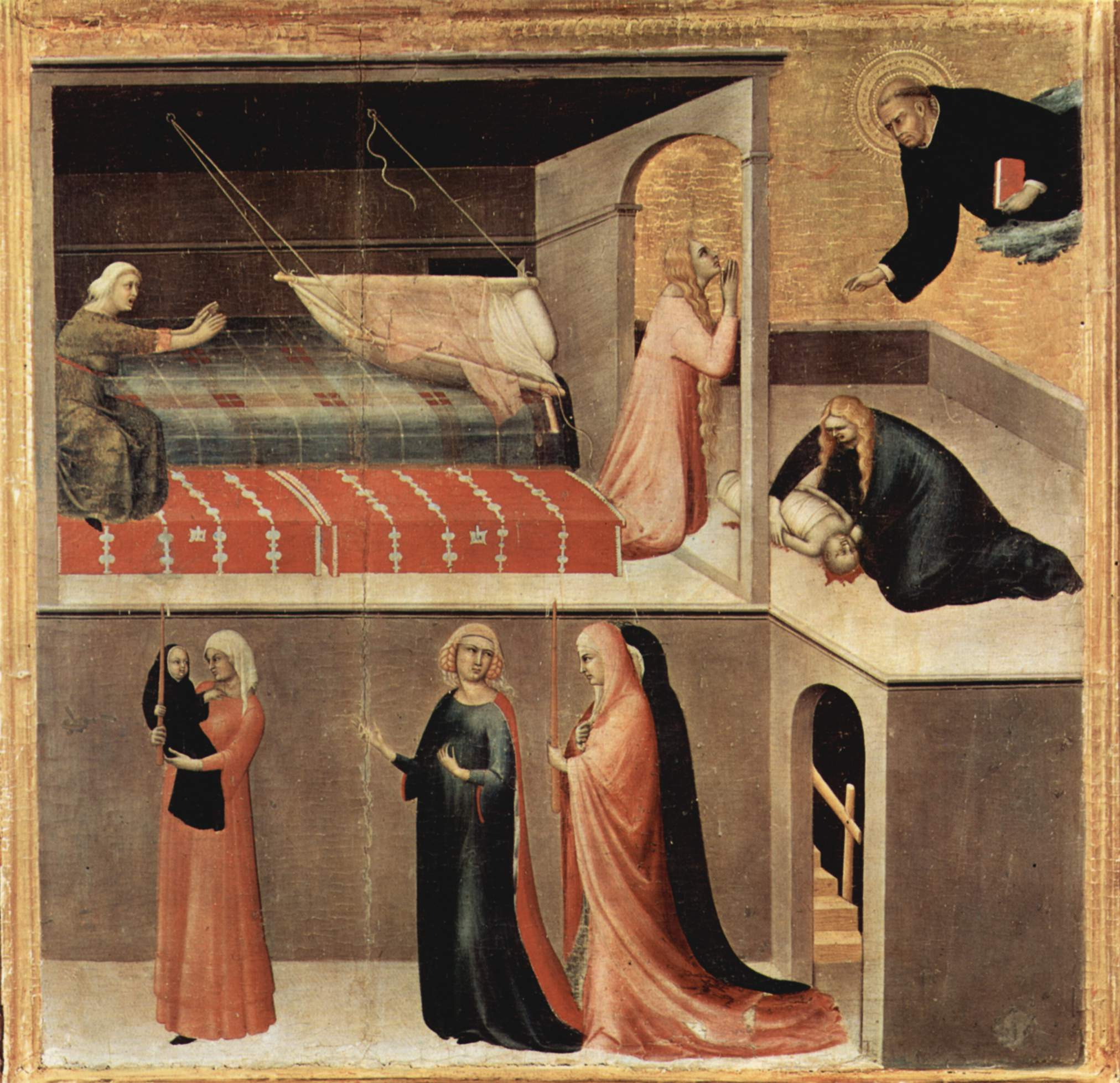
Rescuing a falling baby from the cradle
