= New Gallery (London) =

Building in London, England, originally an art gallery, then cinema, church, store

Coordinates: 51.5106°N 0.1390°W

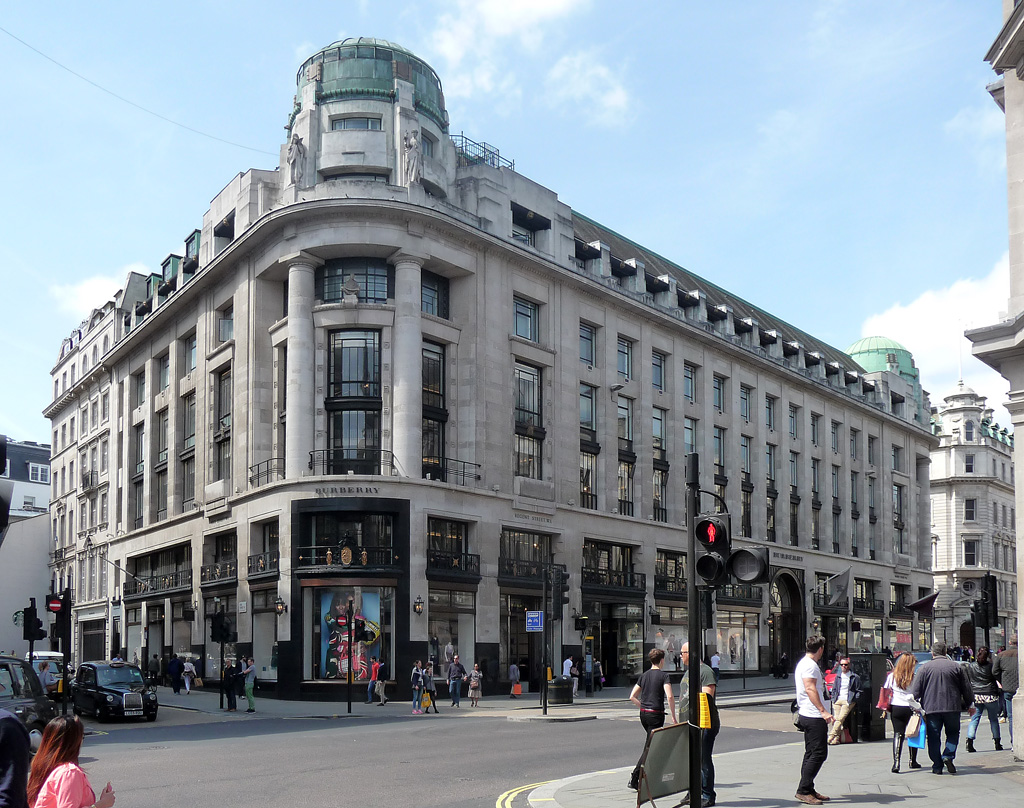
External view

The New Gallery is a Crown Estate-owned Grade II Listed building at 121 Regent Street, London, which originally was an art gallery from 1888 to 1910, The New Gallery Restaurant from 1910 to 1913, The New Gallery Cinema from 1913 to 1953, and a Seventh-day Adventist Church from 1953 to 1992. After having been empty for more than ten years, the building was a Habitat furniture store from 2006 to 2011, and since September 2012 it is a flagship store for Burberry.

== The gallery period ==
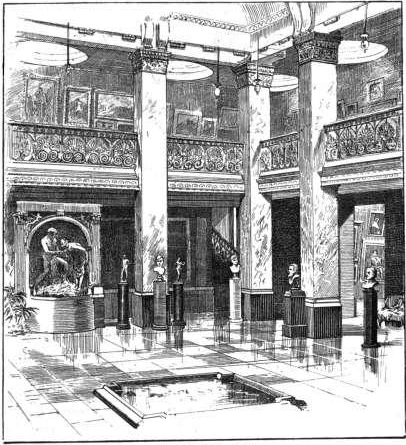
Central Hall of the New Gallery, from the catalogue New Gallery Notes, Summer 1888.

The New Gallery was founded in 1888 by J. Comyns Carr and Charles Edward Hallé. Carr and Hallé had been co-directors of Sir Coutts Lindsay's Grosvenor Gallery, but resigned from that troubled gallery in 1887. The building was designed by Edward Robert Robson FSA, and constructed in little more than three months to ensure that it could open in the summer of 1888.

The gallery was built on the site of an old fruit market. Existing cast-iron columns supporting the roof were encased with marble to give the impression of "massive marble shafts" topped with gilded Greek capitals. The architrave, frieze, and cornices above the columns were covered with platinum leaf. At the opening, the West and North Galleries on the ground floor were devoted to oil paintings, and the first floor balcony around the Central Hall displayed smaller works in oils, watercolours, etchings and drawings. Sculpture was displayed in the Central Hall itself.

== Artists and exhibitions ==
The New Gallery continued the ideals of the Grosvenor, and was an important venue for Pre-Raphaelite and Aesthetic movement artists. Edward Burne-Jones, then at the height of his popularity, supported the new venture, serving on its Consulting Committee and lending three large oils for the opening, thus ensuring its financial success. Lawrence Alma-Tadema and William Holman Hunt also joined the Consulting Committee, and George Frederic Watts and Lord Leighton transferred their loyalty to the New Gallery.

The private view of the first exhibition was held on Tuesday, 8 May 1888, and the exhibition opened to the public on Wednesday, 9 May, for three months. The private view was a great social success, with former Prime Minister William Ewart Gladstone among the early arrivals.

In October and November 1888, the New Gallery hosted the first showcase of industrial and applied arts by the Arts and Crafts Exhibition Society under the direction of its founding president, illustrator and designer Walter Crane. No attempt had been made to show contemporary decorative arts in London since the Grosvenor Gallery's Winter Exhibition of 1881, which included cartoons for mosaic, tapestry, and glass, and the Society's annual (later triennial) exhibitions at the New Gallery were important events in the Arts and Crafts Movement at the end of the 19th century.

In 1890, the New Gallery held an important exhibition of Tudor portraits and relics under the auspices of Queen Victoria.

The New Gallery was the setting for a major Burne-Jones retrospective in 1892–93 and a memorial exhibition of his works in 1898. In 1893 the New Gallery exposed for the first time four panels by Masaccio, later attributed to the Pisa Polyptych (now in Staatliche Museen, Berlin).

Carr continued as co-director until 1908. The Arts and Crafts Exhibition of 1910 was the last to be held at the New Gallery.

== Later uses for the building ==
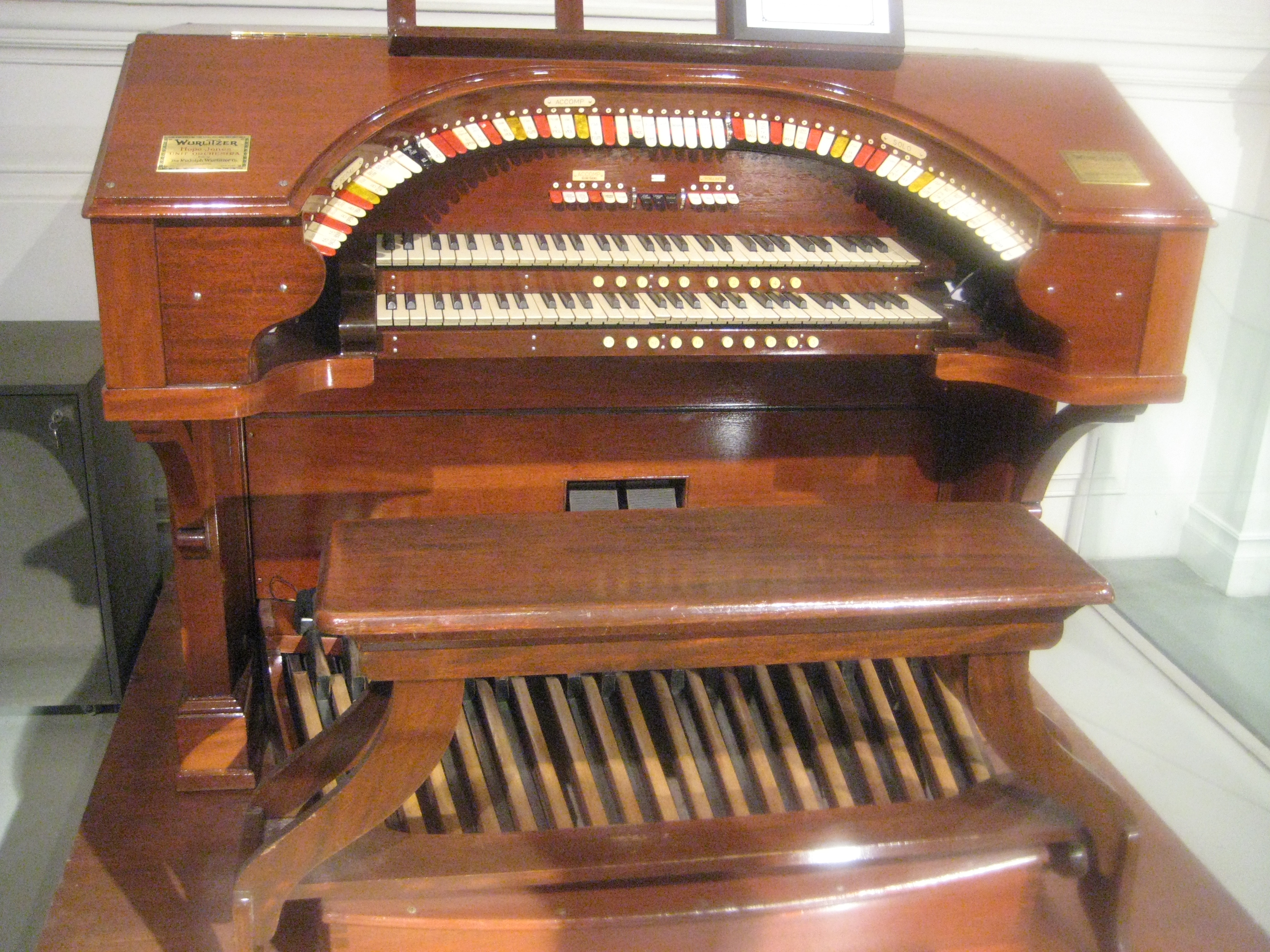
The New Gallery's Wurlitzer organ, which is still located in the building but rarely played

In 1910, the interior was converted into The New Gallery Restaurant, but it was converted again in January 1913, this time to a cinema. Enlargement and modifications were made to the cinema in 1925, including the installation of a Wurlitzer organ. It was the location of the UK showing of the first full-length animated cartoon, Snow White and the Seven Dwarfs in 1938.

After World War II the cinema struggled, partly because it was slightly off-West End, and the then owners, Gaumont British Theatres. sold the lease to the Seventh-day Adventist Church and was used as a church from 1953 until the 1990s, although the cinema was occasionally used for religious films. It remained empty until 2006, when it became a Habitat furniture store. The Wurlitzer organ remained in place and was restored to its original condition.

Habitat surrendered the lease in March 2011, and in September 2012 the site become a flagship store for Burberry.

The New Gallery became a Grade II Listed building in 1992.
