= Stefanone =

Italian painter

Stefanone (active c. 1350 – c. 1390) was an Italian painter of the Trecento, active in Naples.

== Biography ==
We have few details of Stefanone but for what is said of him by Bernardo de' Dominici in his biography of Neapolitan painters. He is believed to have trained along with Gennaro di Cola under Simone Martini. He painted a San Lodovico vescovo di Tolosa, begun by Simone.
