= Orsini Polyptych =

Dismembered altarpiece by Simone Martini

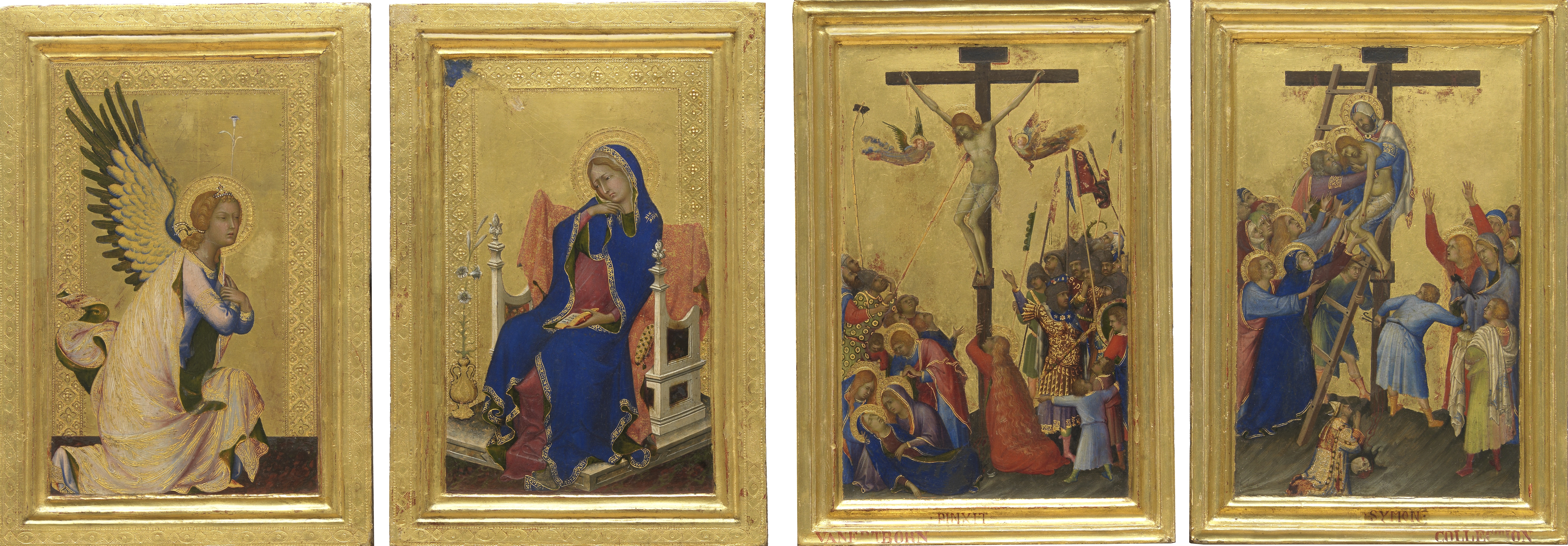
- The Antwerp panels
- Artist: Simone Martini
- Year: 1333–1340
- Medium: Tempera on panel

The Orsini Polyptych (also known as the Orsini Altarpiece or Passion Polyptych) is an altarpiece produced at an unknown location by Simone Martini for private devotion by a cardinal of the Orsini family. Its precise date is still under discussion. It was taken to France very early in its lifespan and formed a major influence on late medieval French artists. It is now split between the Louvre in Paris, the Royal Museum of Fine Arts in Antwerp and the Gemäldegalerie in Berlin.

On the back of the Louvre panel (Christ Bearing the Cross) is the coat of arms of the Orsini family. It shows the man who commissioned the painting dressed as a cardinal at the foot of the Cross. Some art historians see this as a portrait of the Roman cardinal Napoleone Orsini, who owned a fragment of the True Cross, which may explain the choice of subject. Under this hypothesis, he commissioned it before leaving Rome for the papal court in Avignon or in Avignon itself, where Martini followed Orsini.

The altarpiece was probably in the Champmol Charterhouse, near Dijon, by the end of the 14th century. It was still there in the prior's chambers in 1791, when it was sold and split up. The four panels in Antwerp (the Crucifixion, the Descent from the Cross, the Archangel Gabriel and the Virgin of the Annunciation) were sold in Dijon in 1826 and acquired for the collection of Florent van Ertborn, mayor of Antwerp; they were originally two panels, with Gabriel and the Virgin on the reverse of the other two panels, before they were later sawn off. Van Ertborn bequeathed these panels to the Royal Museum of Fine Arts in 1841. The Louvre panel (Christ Bearing the Cross) was bought from a man named L. Saint-Denis in 1834. The Berlin panel (the Entombment) was bought from the Paris art dealer Émile Pacully in 1904. Originally it had the same golden background as the other panels, but this was painted over in red, probably in the middle of the 15th century.

== Reconstruction ==
When open, the altarpiece had four scenes of Christ's Passion on one side, from left to right Christ Bearing the Cross (Louvre), the Crucifixion (Antwerp), the Descent from the Cross (Antwerp) and the Entombment (Berlin). On the reverse of the two central panels were the two Annunciation panels, now in Antwerp. On the reverse of one of the outer panels, Christ Bearing the Cross, is the coat of arms of the Orsini family. The Berlin panel probably had the same on its reverse, but this is now lost through subsequent alterations of the panel.

Front panels
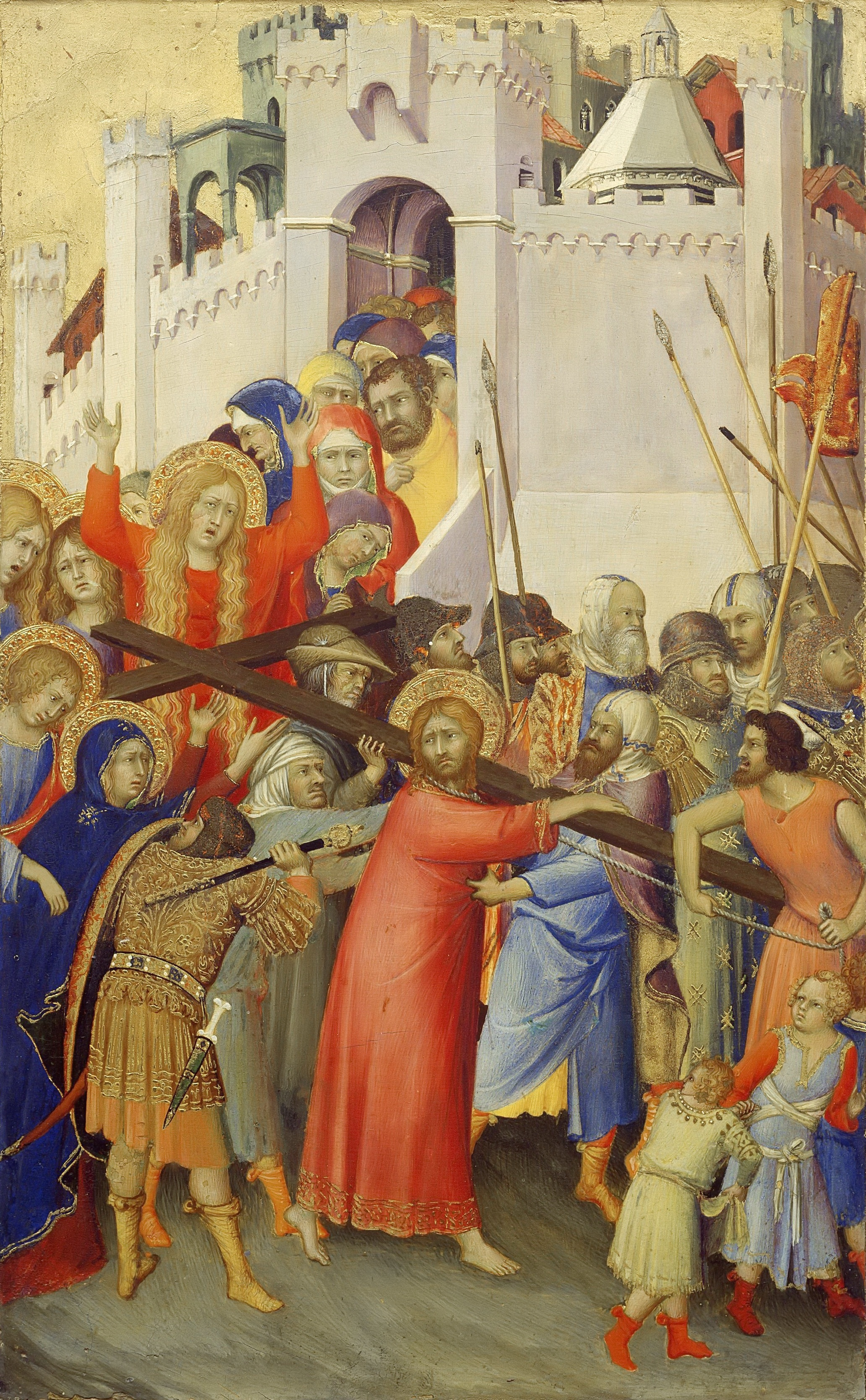
Christ Bearing the Cross

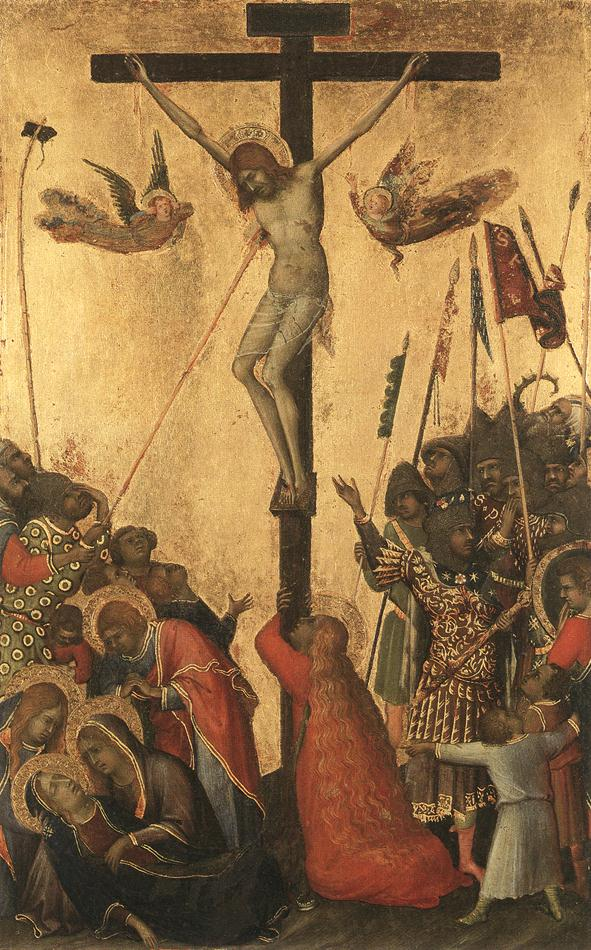
Crucifixion

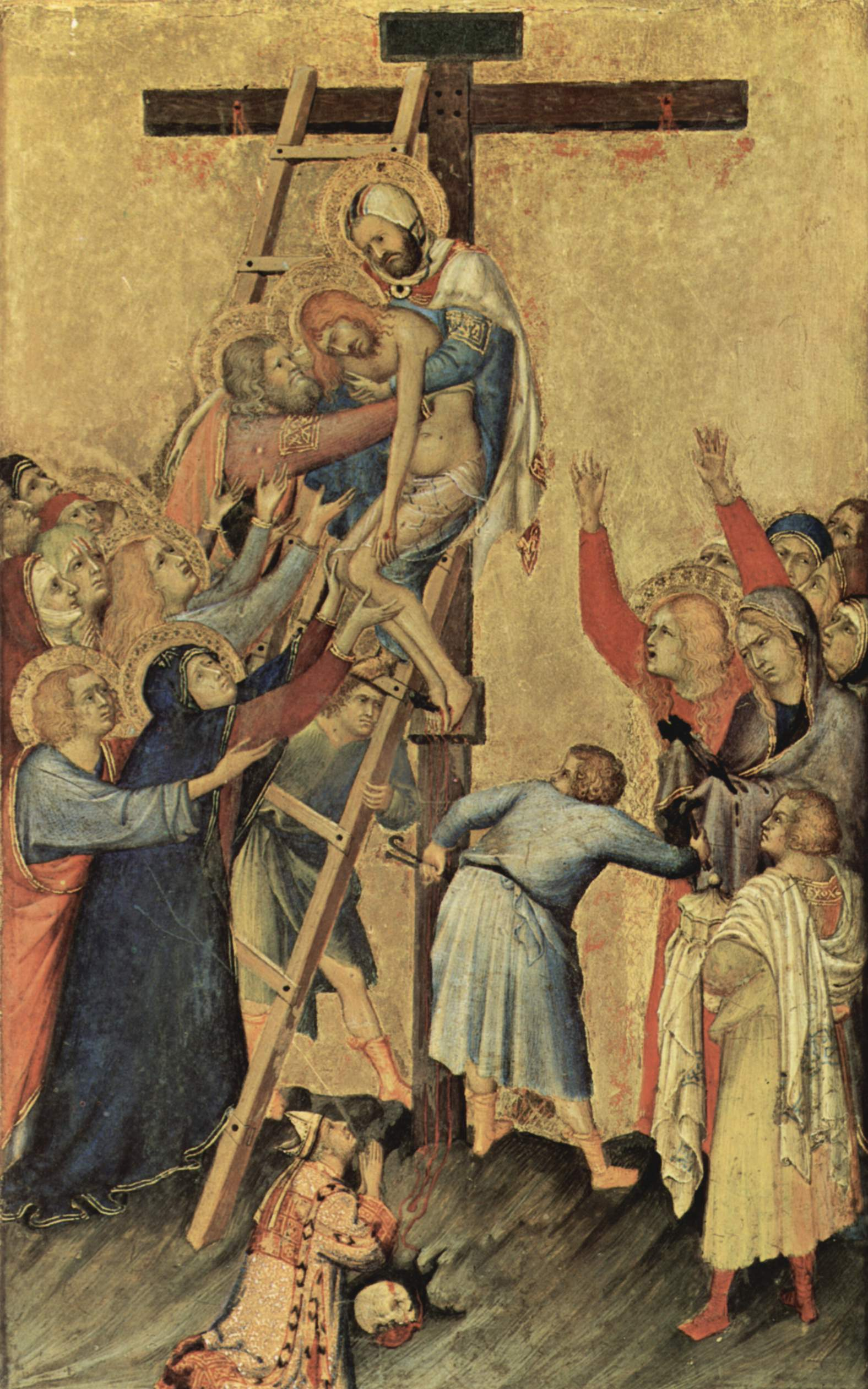
Descent from the Cross

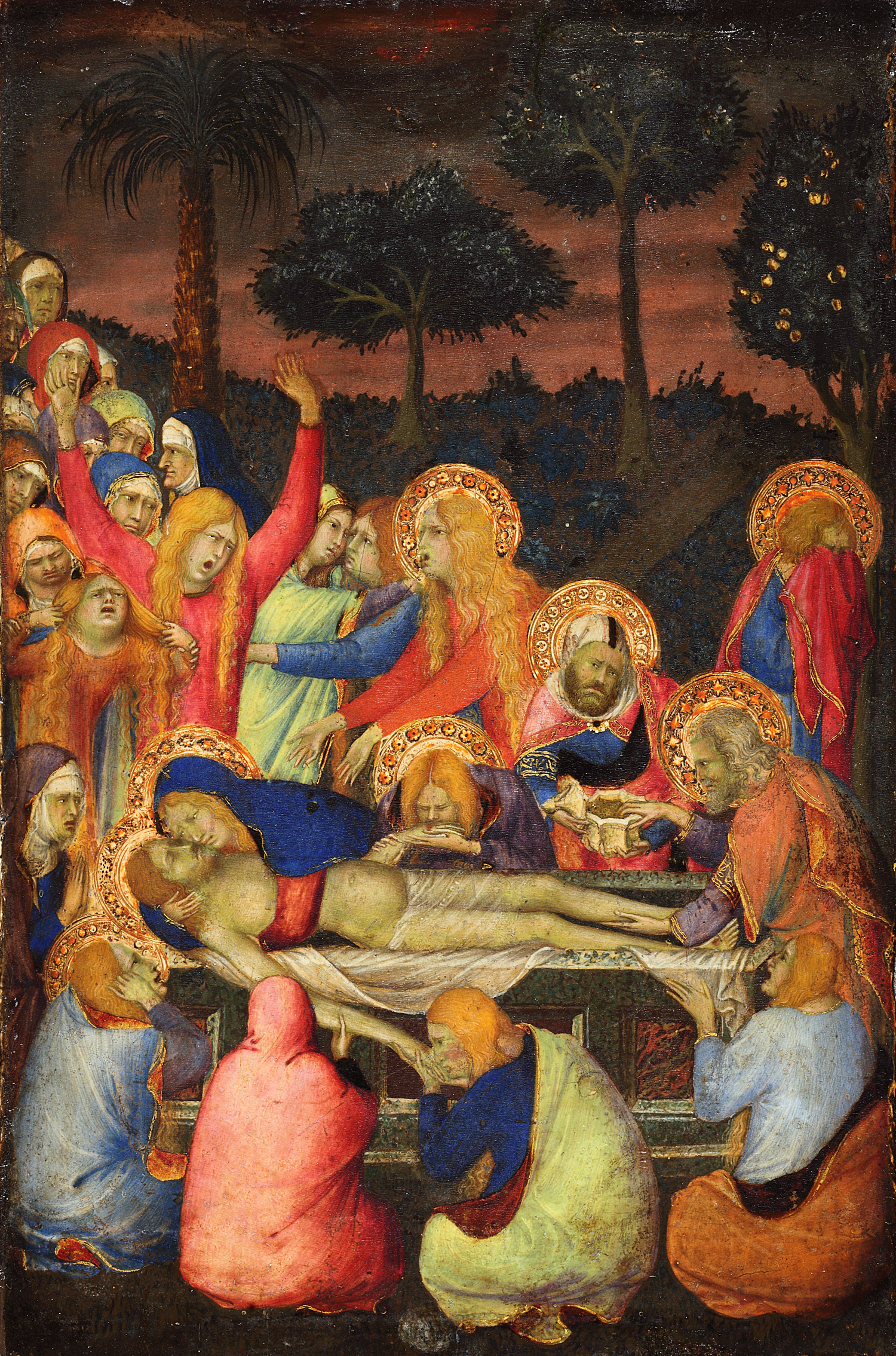
Entombment
Reverse panels
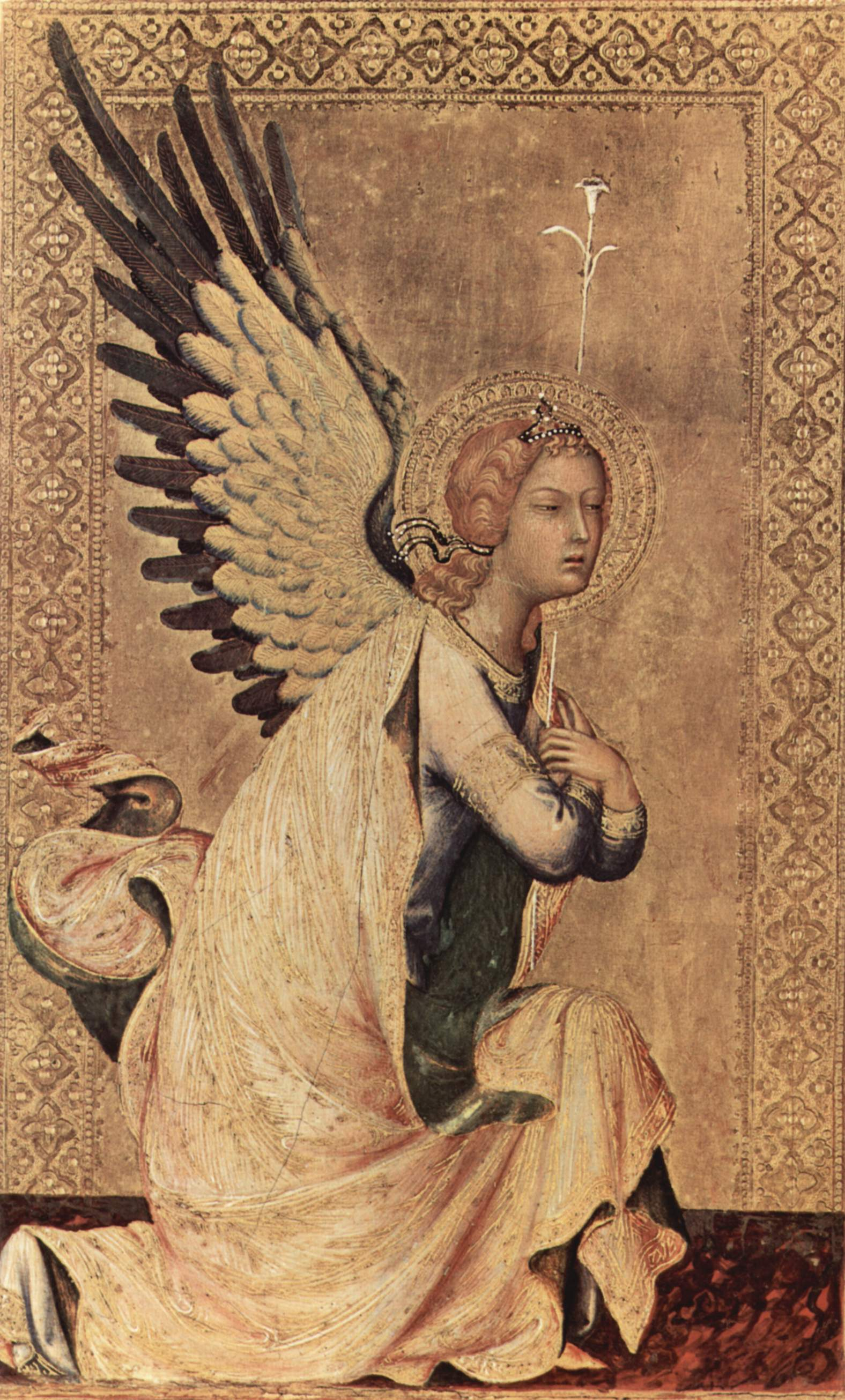
Archangel Gabriel

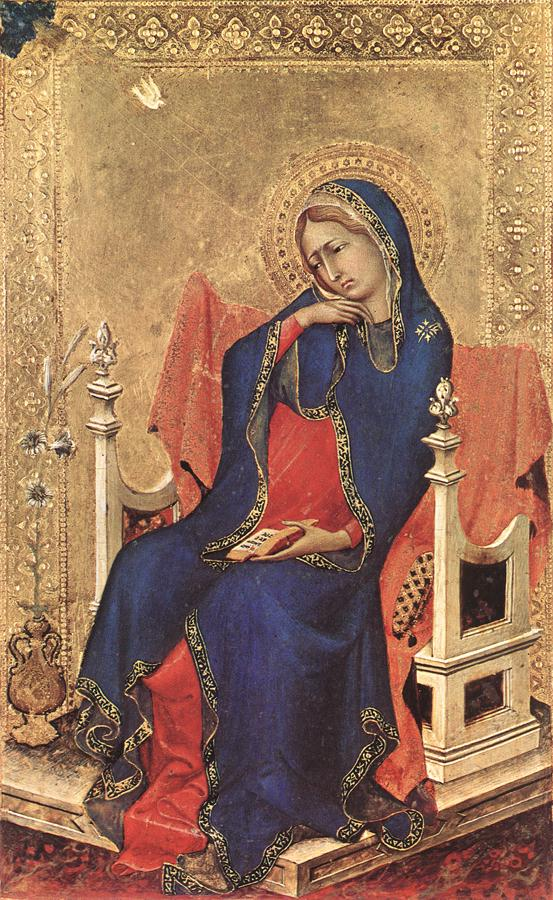
Virgin of the Annunciation

== Related works ==
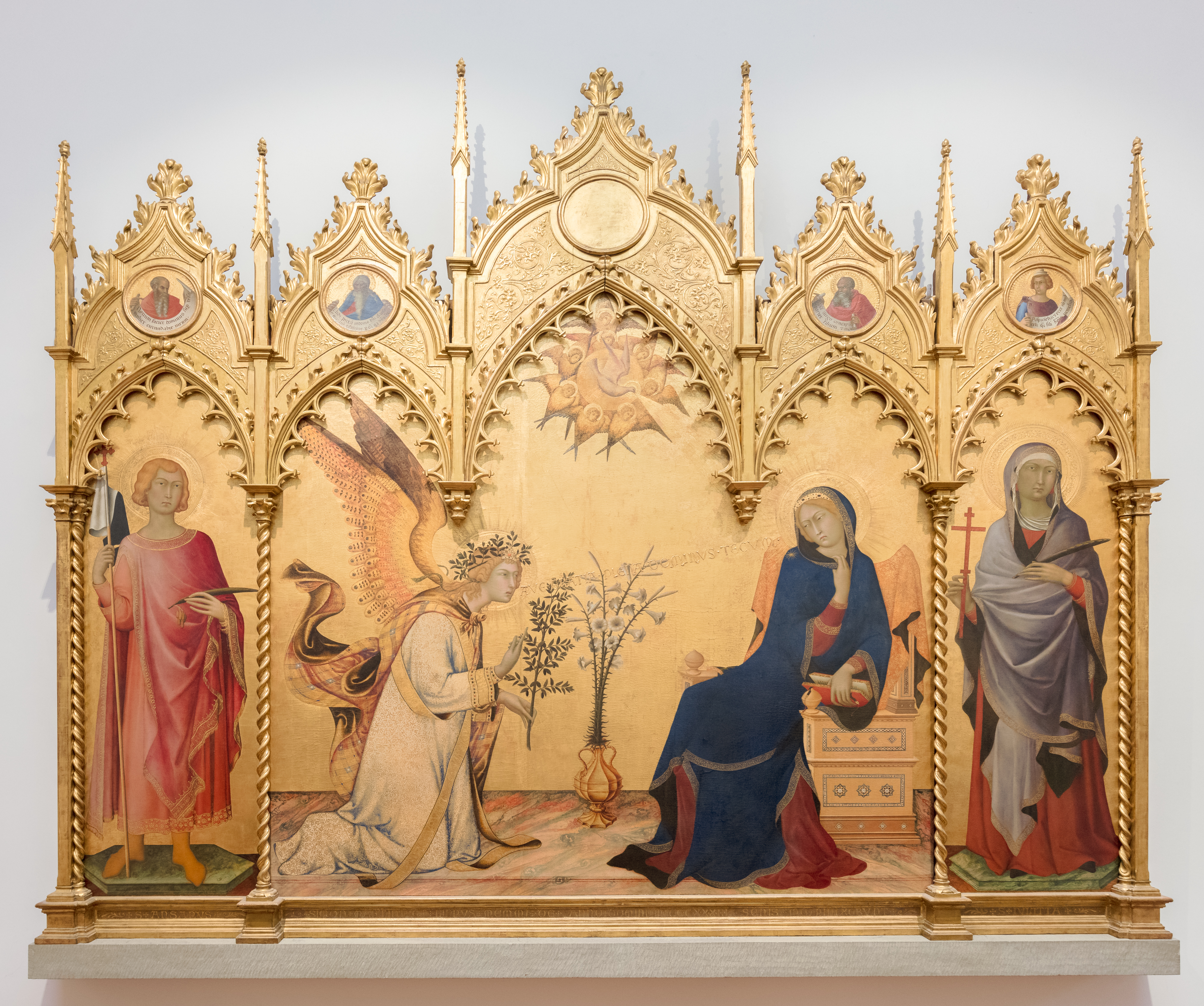
Simone Martini and Lippo Memmi, Annunciation, 1333, Uffizi, Florence

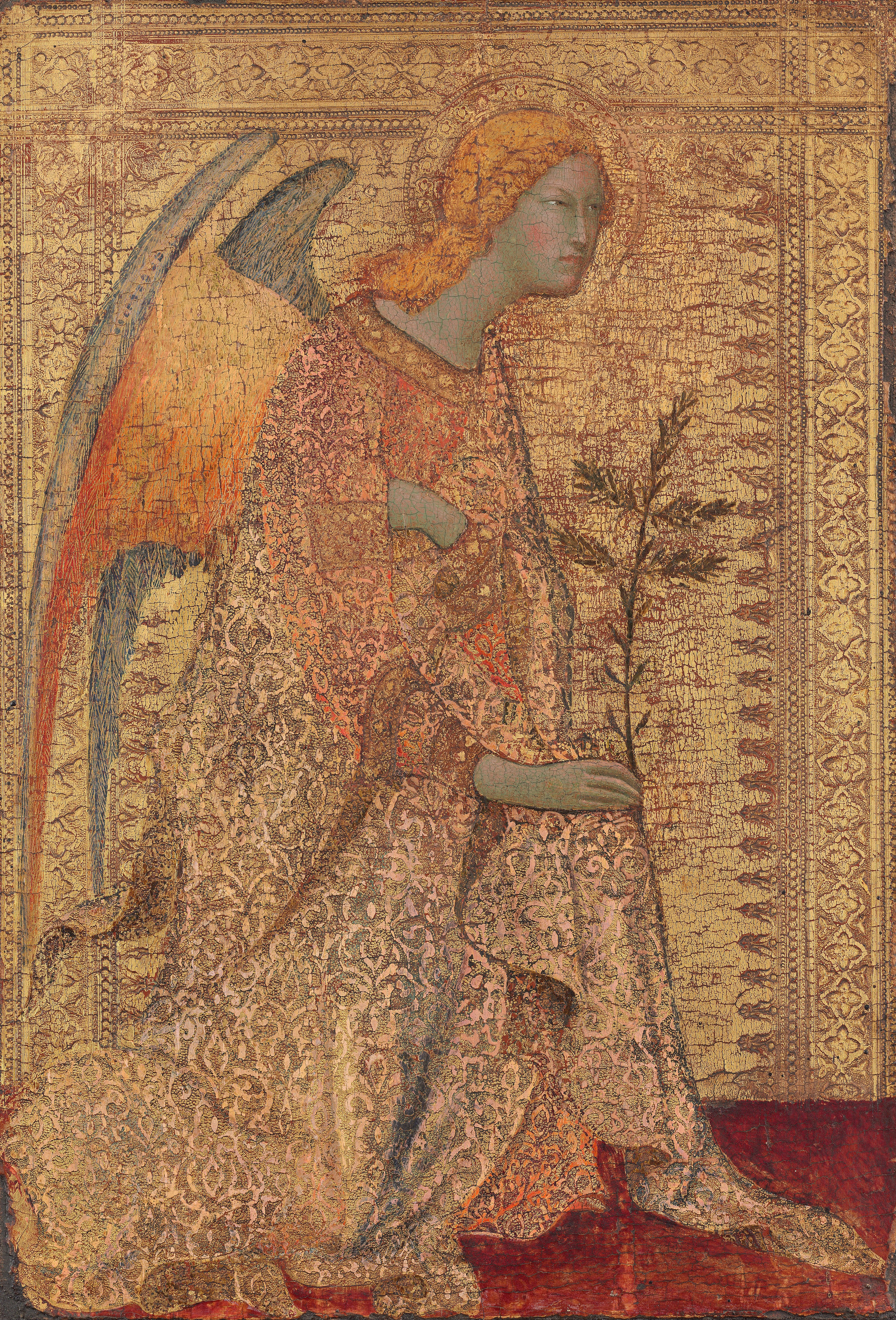
Simone Martini, Angel of the Annunciation, c. 1330, National Gallery of Art, Washington, DC

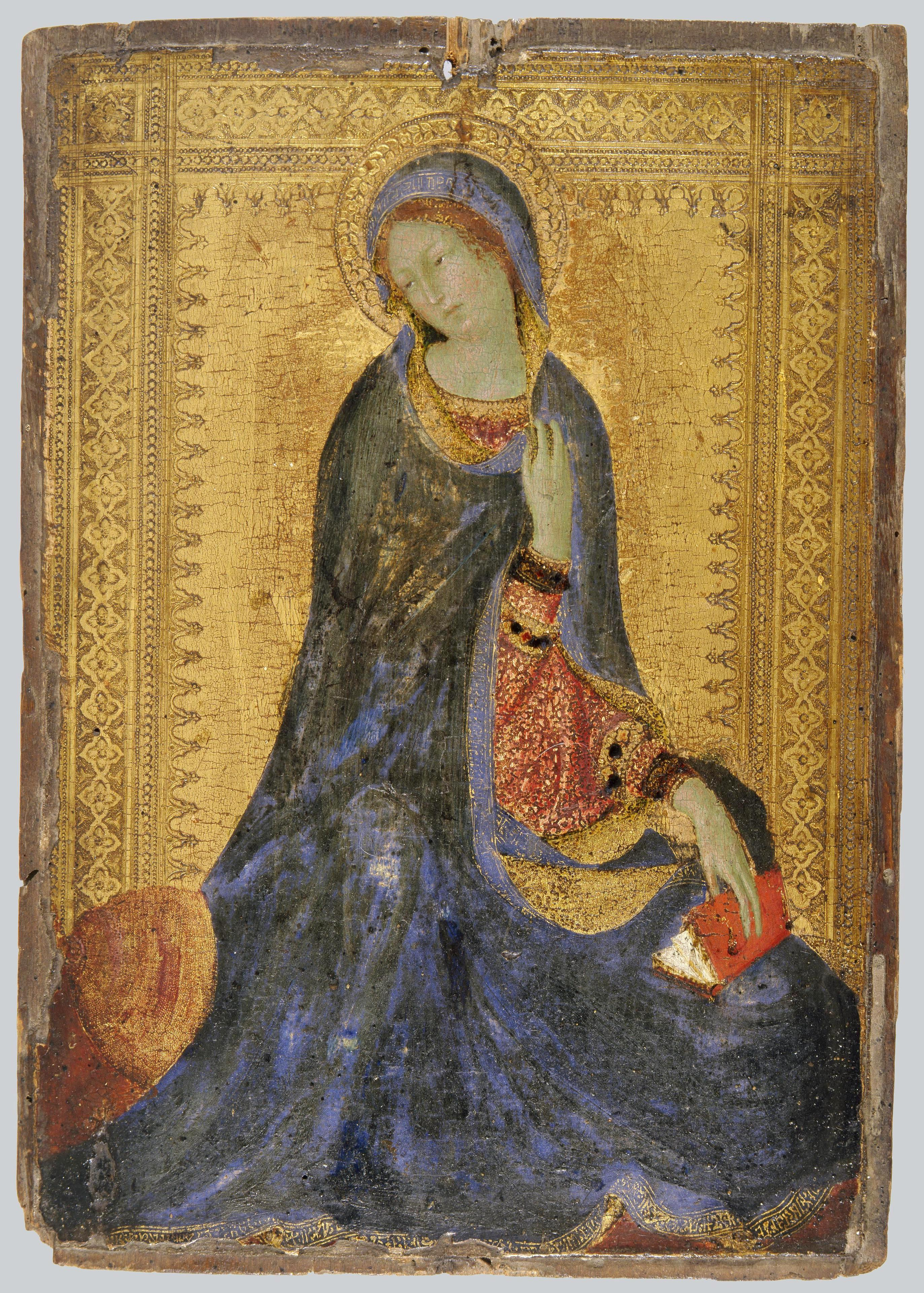
Simone Martini, Virgin of the Annunciation, c. 1330, Hermitage Museum, Saint Petersburg

== Bibliography ==
- Victor M. Schmidt, "Painted Piety: Panel Paintings for Personal Devotion in Tuscany, ca. 1250–1400", Florence, Centro Di, coll. Italia e Paesi Bassi, 2005 (ISBN 978-8870384277), pp. 256–260
- Joel Brink, "Cardinal Napoleone Orsini and Chiara della Croce: A Note on the 'Monache' in Simone Martini's 'Passion Altarpiece'", Zeitschrift für Kunstgeschichte, no. 46. Bd., H. 4, 1983, pp. 419–424
