= Blessed Agostino Novello Triptych =

Triptych by Simone Martini

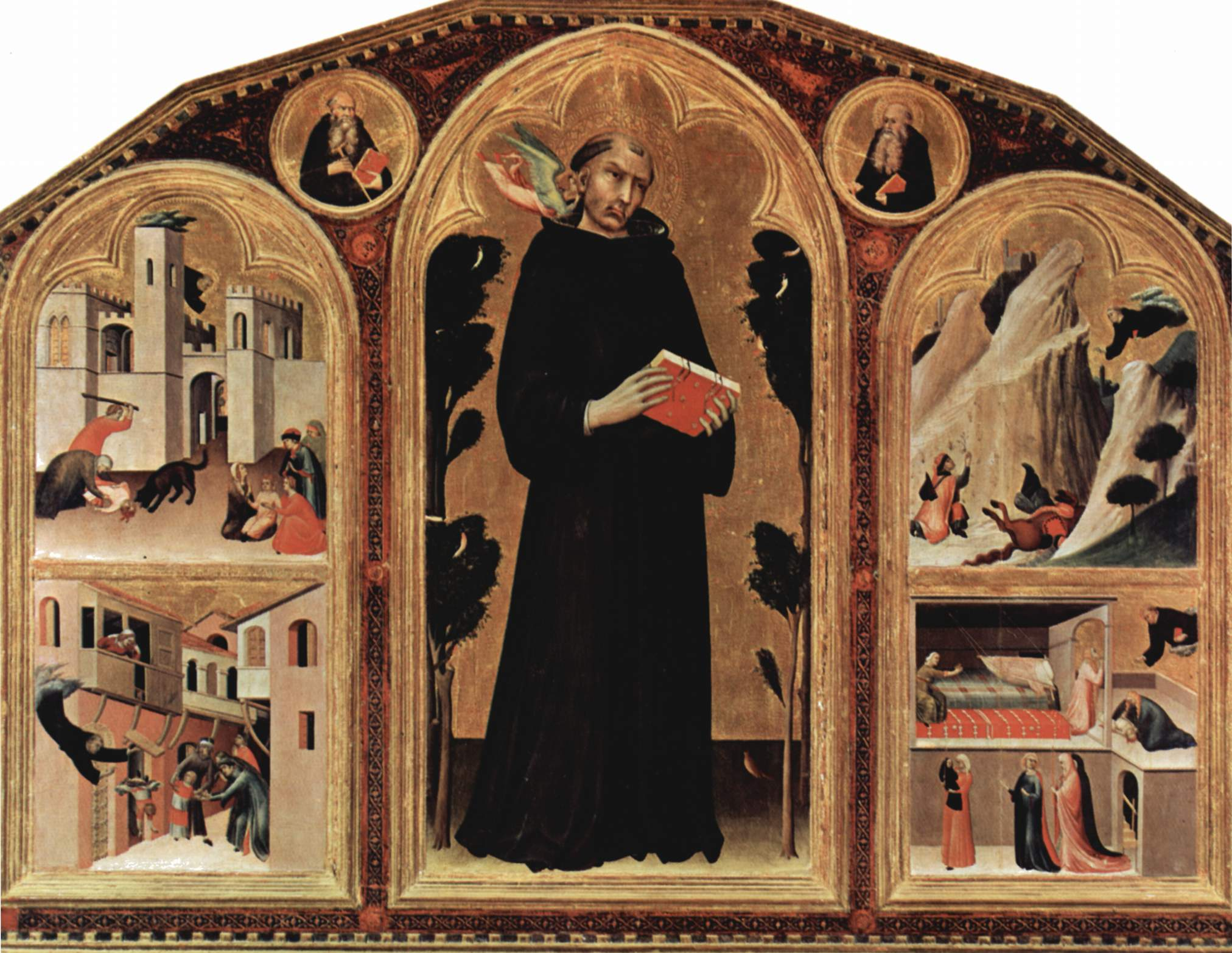
Blessed Agostino Novello Triptych (1324-1328)

The Blessed Agostino Novello Triptych is a tempera on panel painting by Simone Martini, produced for a church in Siena between 1324 and 1328, at which time he had just returned from Assisi, Pisa and Orvieto to work on his frescoes at the Palazzo Pubblico. It now hangs in the Pinacoteca Nazionale in Siena.

Its central panel shows Agostino Novello (1240-1309), prior-general of the Augustinian Order from around 1290 and later retiring to a hermitage in San Leonardo al Lago near Sienna. he holds a red book (the Order's Constitutions, which he edited) and an angel whispers divine inspiration into his right ear. Two small tondoes show unidentified Fathers of the Church, whilst the two side panels show miracles associated with Agostino, namely the child attacked by a wolf and the child who fell from a balcony on the left panel and the knight falling into a ravine and the child falling from its cradle on the right panel. All four scenes show the accident, the saint's intervention, the prayer which followed the miracle and a depiction of Sienna or the landscape around it.

The work had previously been attributed to Lippo Memmi before Sienese art historian Lucy Olcott restored the attribution to Simone Martini in 1903.

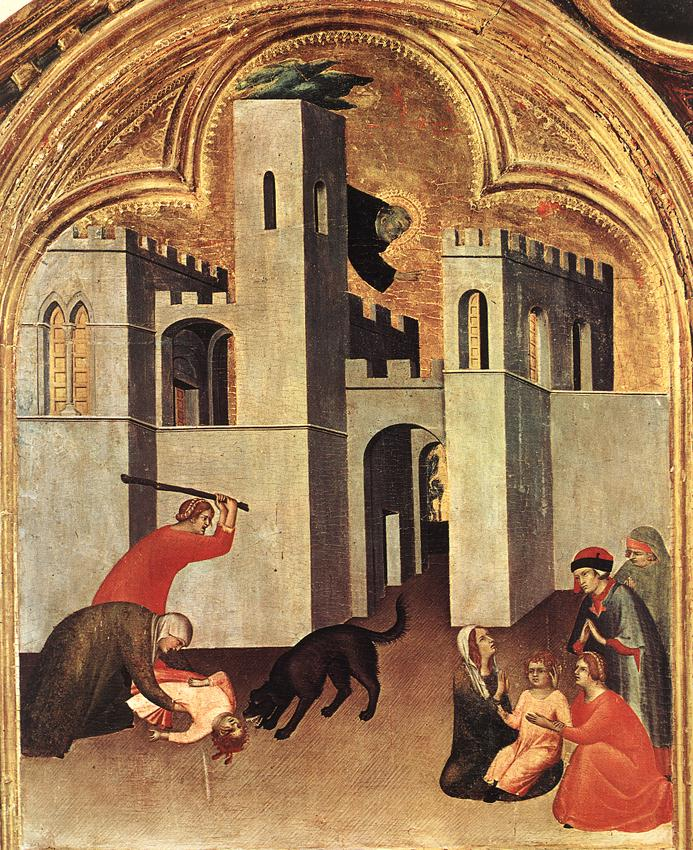
Child attacked by a wolf.

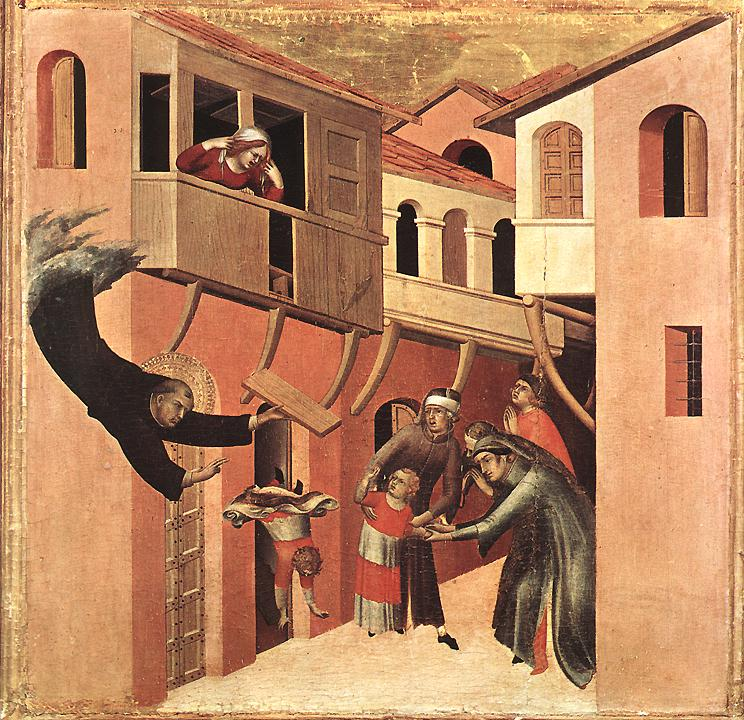
Child falling from a balcony.

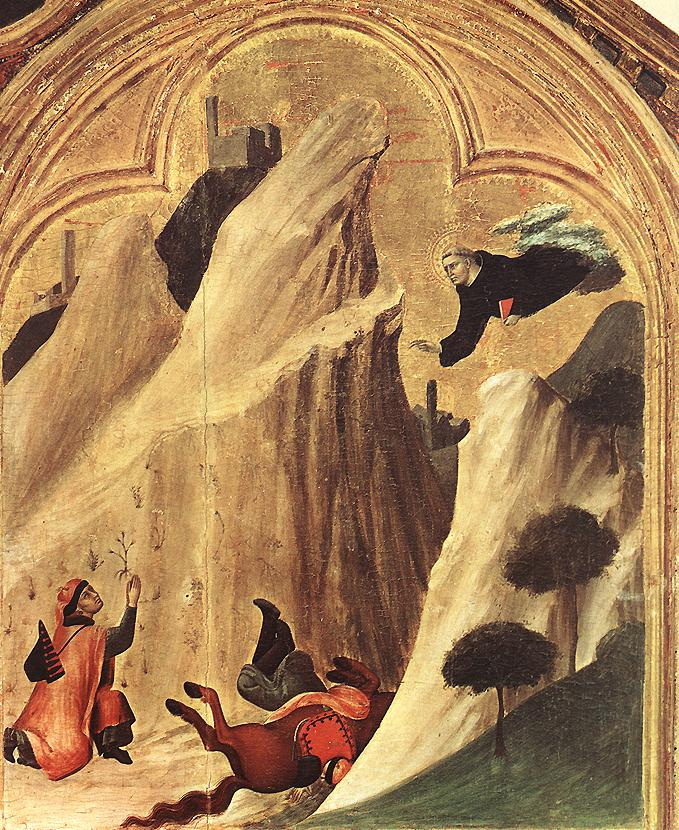
Knight falling into a ravine.

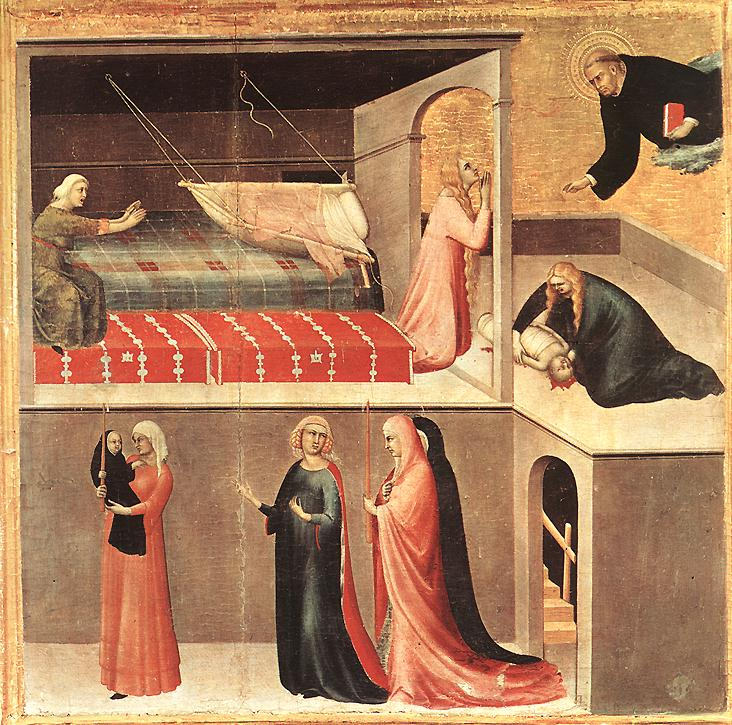
Child falling from its cradle.

== Sources ==
- Heywood, William; Olcott, Lucy (1903). Guide to Siena: History and Art. E. Torrini. OCLC 6980800.
