= Saint Louis of Toulouse Crowning His Brother Robert of Anjou =

Painting by Simone Martini

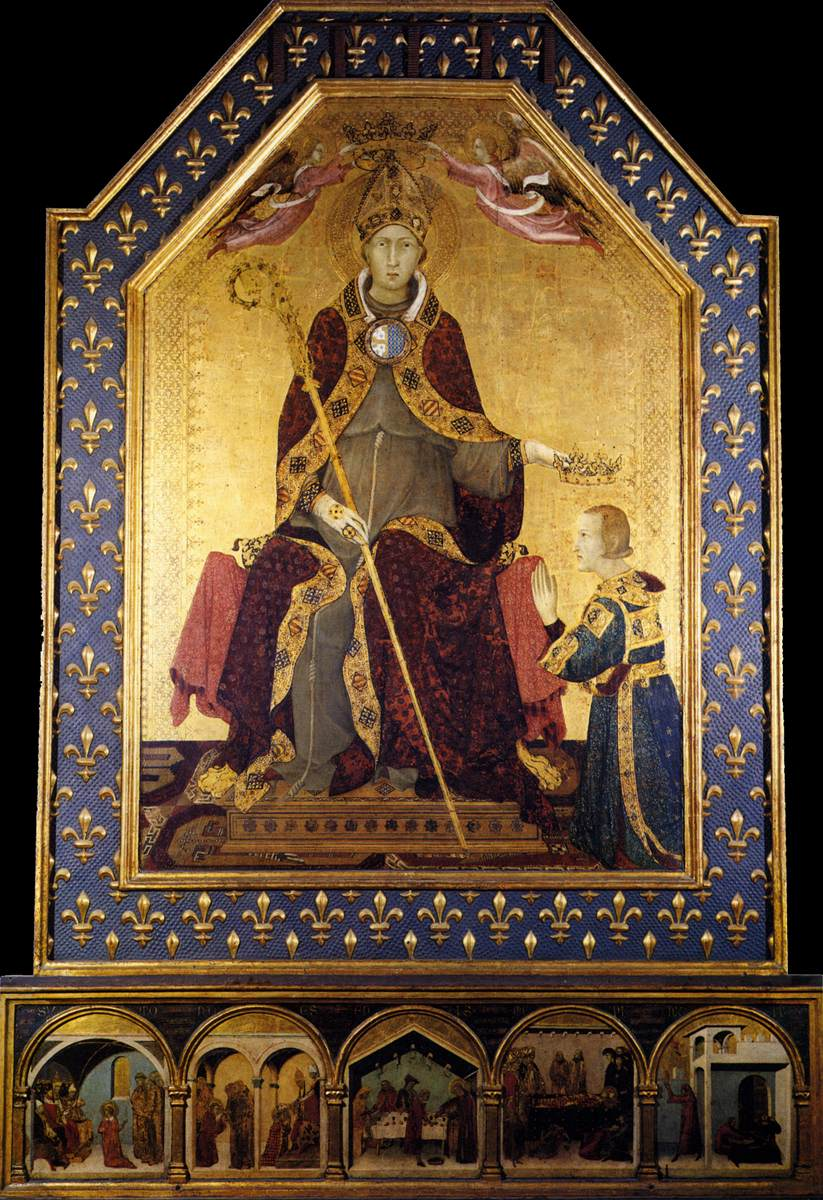
Saint Louis of Toulouse Crowning His Brother Robert of Anjou (c. 1317) by Simone Martini

Saint Louis of Toulouse Crowning His Brother Robert of Anjou is a painting by Simone Martini, commissioned from him by Robert of Anjou during the artist's stay in Naples around 1317. It shows Robert being crowned by his elder brother Louis of Toulouse, who was made a saint in 1317. It is now in the National Museum of Capodimonte in Naples.

== Bibliography ==
- Pierluigi Leone de Castris, Simone Martini, Federico Motta Editore, Milano 2003.
- Chiara Frugoni, Le storie di San Francesco. Guida agli affreschi della Basilica superiore di Assisi, Einaudi, 2010.
- P. de Rynck, Simone Martini: «San Luis de Toulouse coronando a Roberto de Anjou, rey de Nápoles», pp. 12–13, Random House Mondadori (2005) ISBN 84-8156-388-9
- Center and Periphery: Studies on Power in the Medieval World in Honor of William Chester Jordan ISBN 978-90-04-24359-0
- Holy Rulers and Blessed Princesses: Dynastic Cults in Medieval Central Europe ISBN 978-0-521-42018-1
