= Maestà (Simone Martini) =

Fresco by Simone Martini

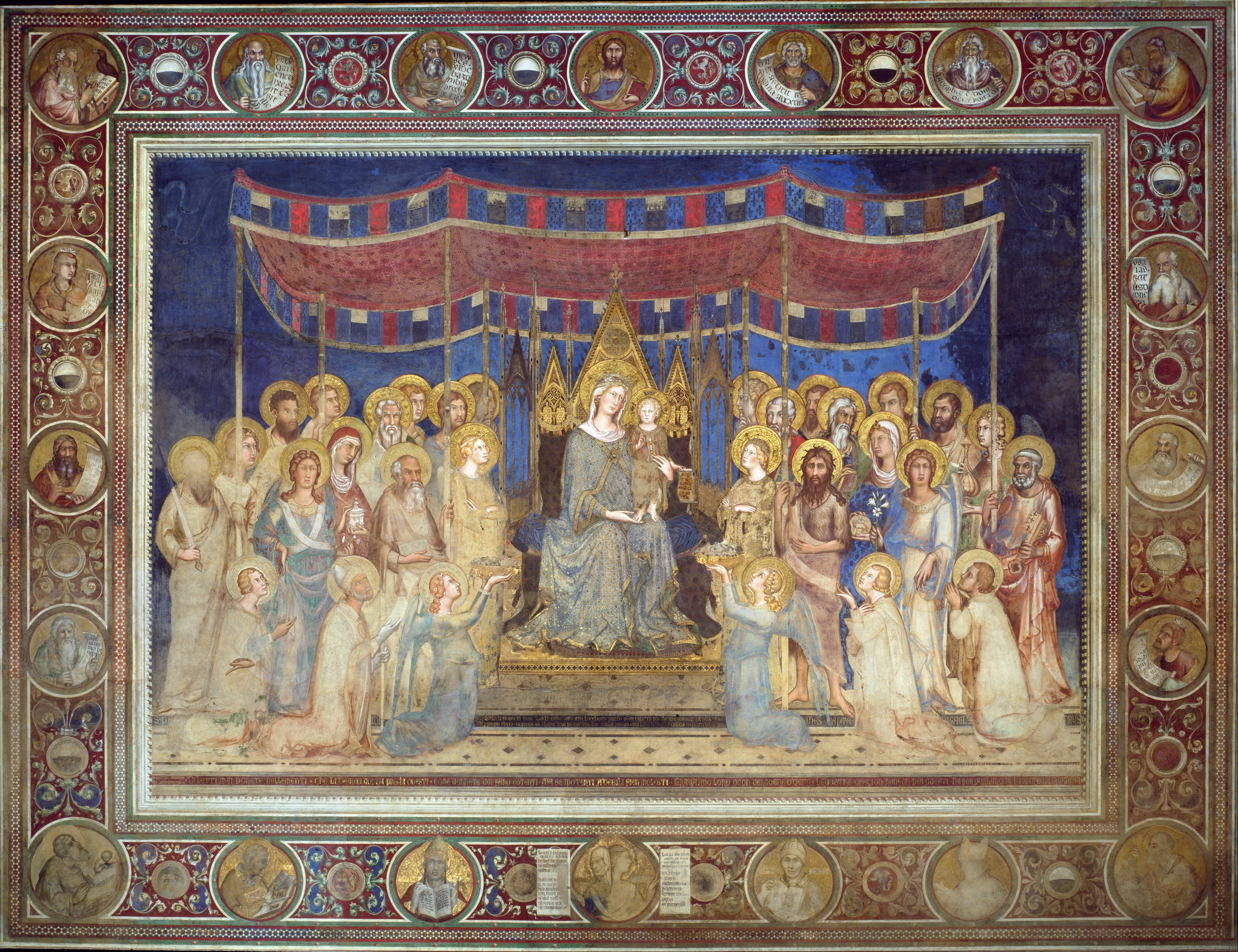
Maestà (c. 1315) by Simone Martini

The Maestà is a large fresco (7.63 x 9.7 m) by Simone Martini. It takes up the whole north wall of the Sala del Mappamondo (or Sala del Consiglio) in the Palazzo Pubblico in Siena. It was created from 1312 to 1315 and is considered one of the artist's masterpieces and one of the most important examples of 14th-century Italian art.
