= Gennaro di Cola =

Italian painter

Gennaro di Cola (c. 1320 – c. 1370) was an Italian painter of the Trecento, active mainly in Naples.

He trained with Simone Martini, and reportedly befriended Giotto. He worked in fresco alongside his pupil Stefanone. His frescoes of the testament scenes in the church of San Giovanni a Carbonara have been lost. In Santa Maria della Pietà, he painted the Mater Dolorosa with dead body of Christ.
