= Simone Martini =

Italian painter from the 14th century (1284–1344)

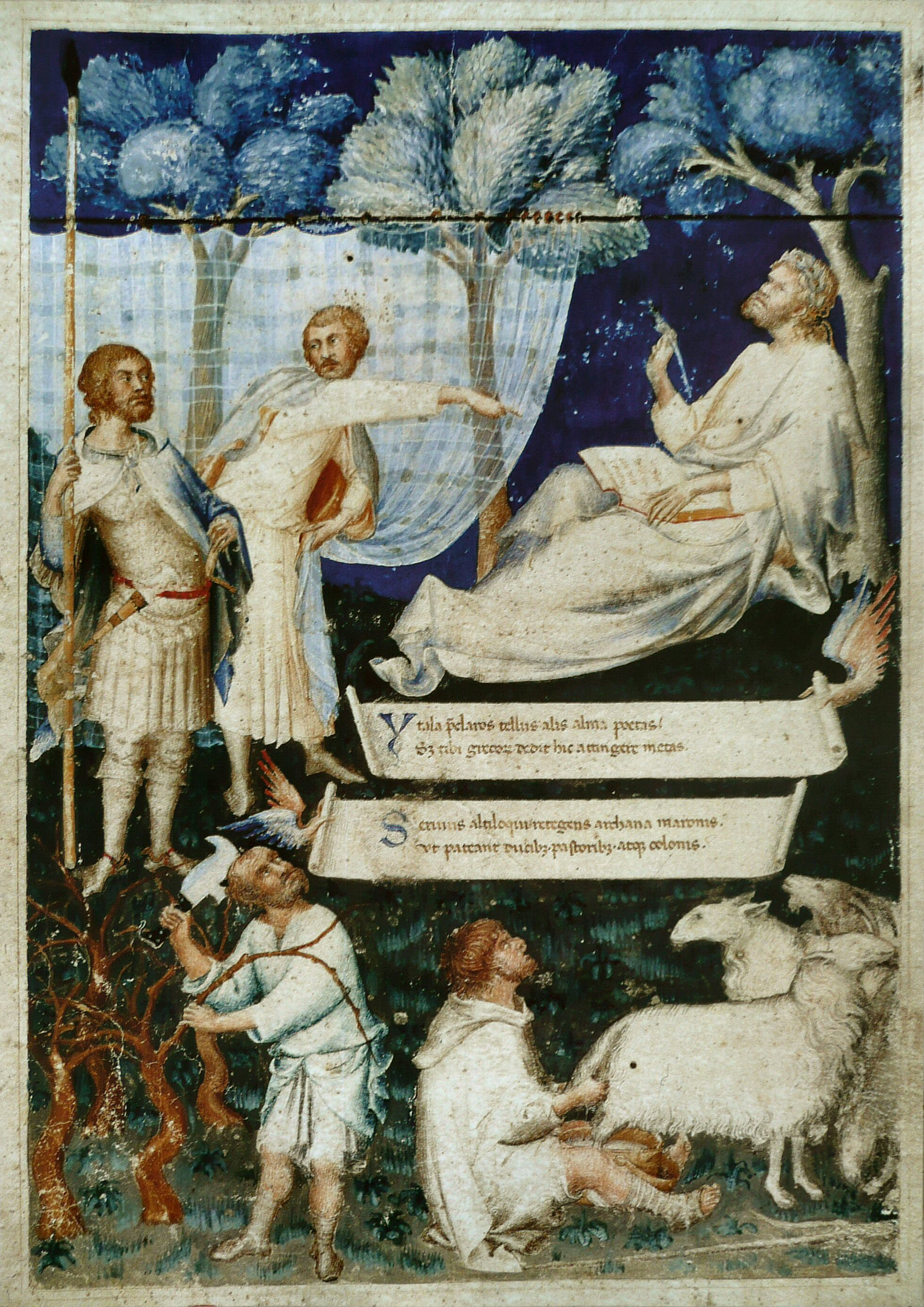
- Petrarch's Virgil (title page) (c. 1336); Illuminated manuscript, 29,5 x 20 cm Biblioteca Ambrosiana, Milan
- Born: Simone Martini c. 1284; Siena, Republic of Siena
- Died: July 1344 (aged 59–60); Avignon, Comtat Venaissin, Papal States
- Education: Duccio di Buoninsegna
- Known for: Painting, Fresco
- Notable work: Annunciation with St. Margaret and St. Ansanus
- Movement: International Gothic

Simone Martini (c. 1284 – July 1344) was an Italian painter born in Siena. He was a major figure in the development of early Italian painting and greatly influenced the development of the International Gothic style.

It is thought that Martini was a pupil of Duccio di Buoninsegna, the leading Sienese painter of his time. According to late Renaissance art biographer Giorgio Vasari, Simone was instead a pupil of Giotto di Bondone, with whom he went to Rome to paint at the Old St. Peter's Basilica, Giotto also executing a mosaic there. Martini's brother-in-law was the artist Lippo Memmi. Very little documentation of Simone's life survives, and many attributions are debated by art historians. According to E. H. Gombrich, he was a friend of Petrarch and had painted a portrait of Laura.

== Biography ==
Simone was doubtlessly apprenticed from an early age, as would have been the normal practice. Among his first documented works is the Maestà of 1315 in the Palazzo Pubblico in Siena. Lippo Memmi painted a similar Maestà for the Palazzo Comunale in San Gimignano shortly afterwards, an example of the enduring influence Simone's prototypes would have on other artists throughout the 14th century. Perpetuating the Sienese tradition, Simone's style contrasted with the sobriety and monumentality of Florentine art, and is noted for its soft, stylized, decorative features, sinuosity of line, and courtly elegance. Simone's art owes much to French manuscript illumination and ivory carving: examples of such art were brought to Siena in the fourteenth century by means of the Via Francigena, a main pilgrimage and trade route from Northern Europe to Rome.

Simone's other major works include the Saint Louis of Toulouse Crowning His Brother Robert of Anjou (1317, now in the permanent collection of the Museo di Capodimonte, Naples); this work was painted during a stay in Naples at the request of the king. During this stay, putative pupils were his son Francesco, Gennaro di Cola, and Stefanone.

Simone also painted the Saint Catherine of Alexandria Polyptych in Pisa (1319) and the Annunciation with St. Margaret and St. Ansanus at the Uffizi in Florence (1333), as well as frescoes in the San Martino Chapel in the lower church of the Basilica of San Francesco d'Assisi. He was commissioned to paint a series of frescos for the porch of the Avignon Cathedral of which only the faint sinopia outlines remain. Francis Petrarch became a friend of Simone's while in Avignon, and two of Petrarch's sonnets (Canzoniere 96 and 130) make reference to a portrait of Laura de Noves that Simone supposedly painted for the poet (according to Vasari). A Christ Discovered in the Temple (1342) is in the collections of Liverpool's Walker Art Gallery.

Simone Martini died while in the service of the Papal court at Avignon in 1344, having likely moved there in 1334 or 1335.

== Gallery ==
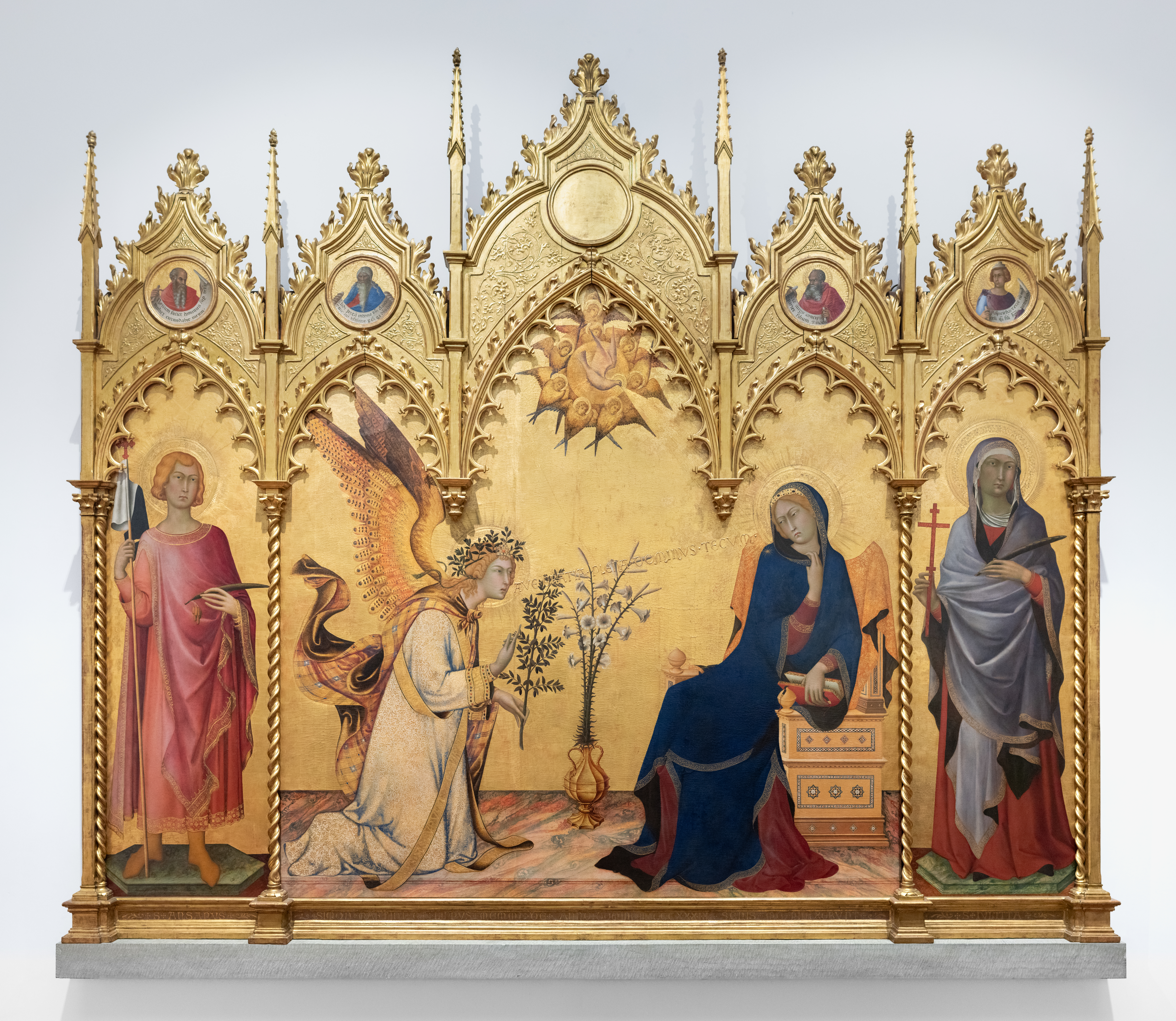
The Annunciation with St. Margaret and St. Ansanus, 1333

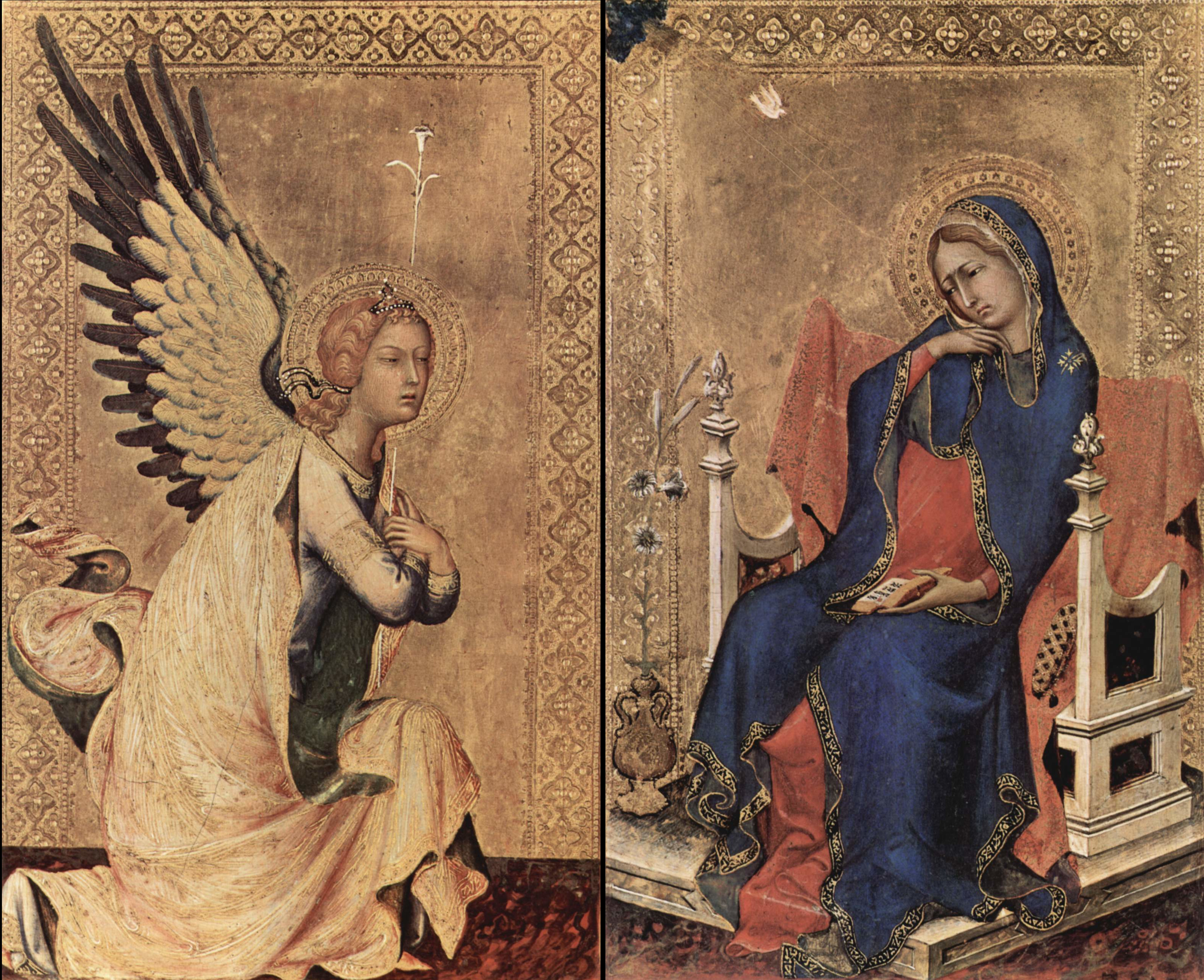
Annunciation Diptych, c. 1333–1340

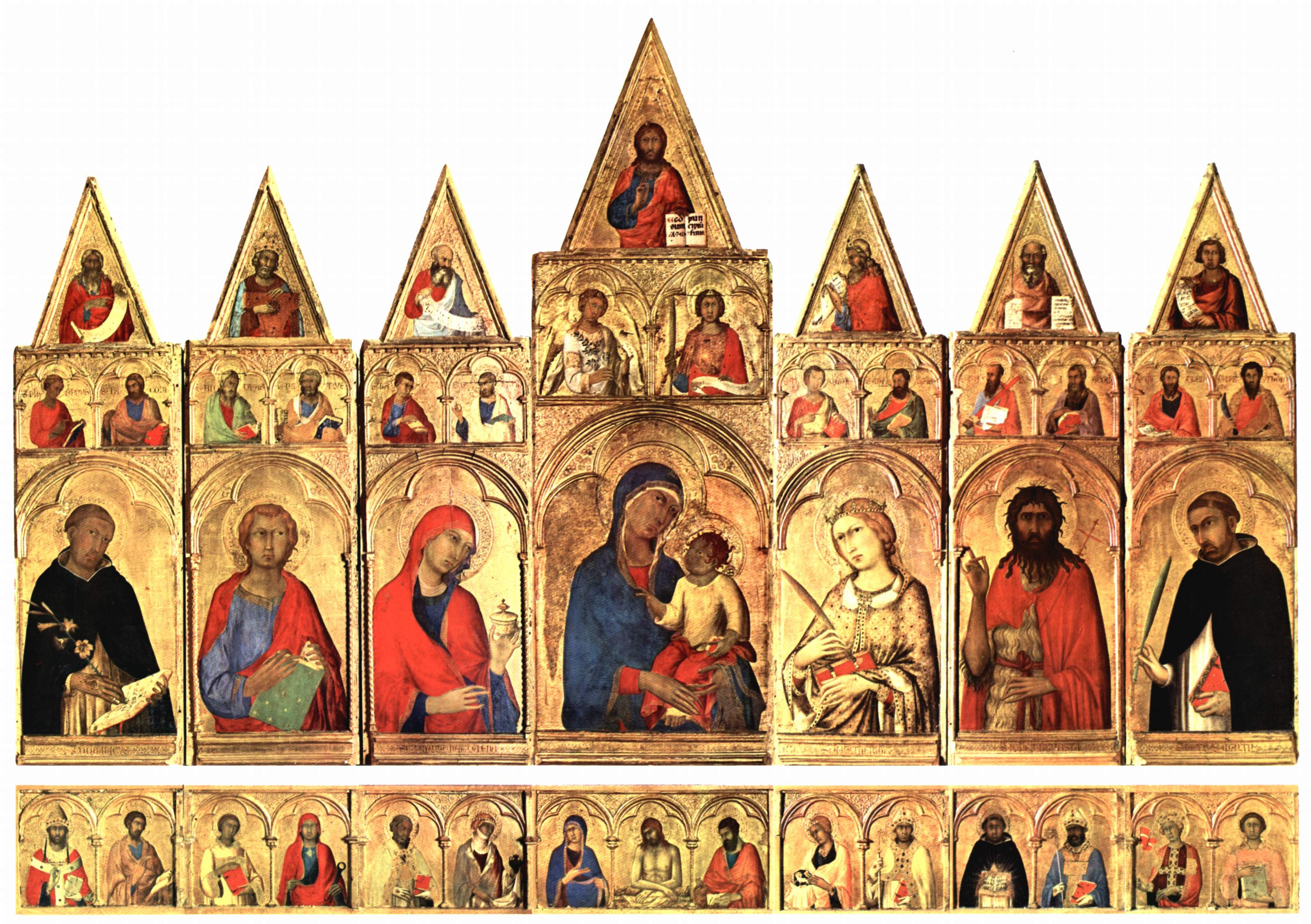
Saint Catherine of Alexandria Polyptych, 1319

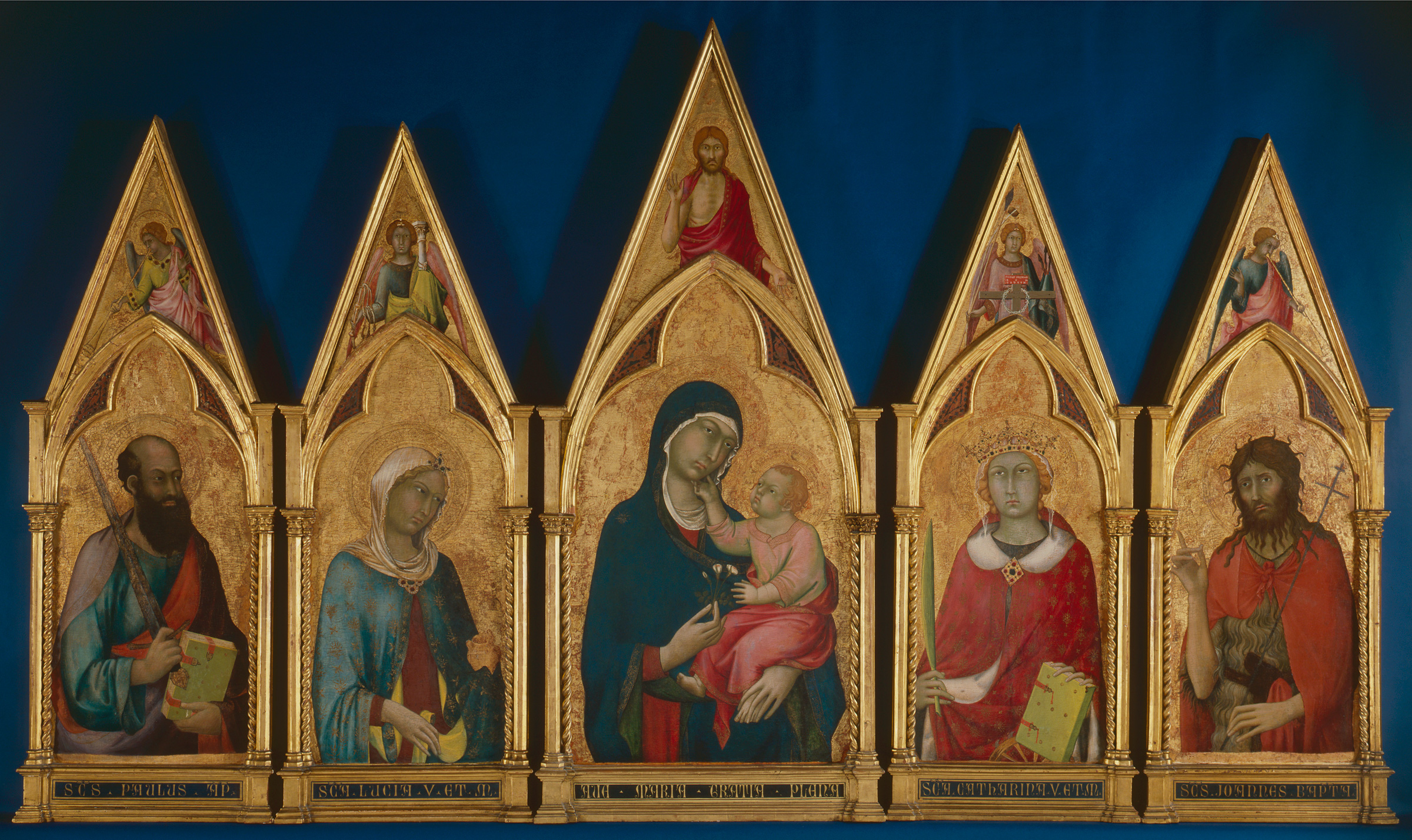
Virgin and Child with Saints (Boston Polyptych), c. 1321–25

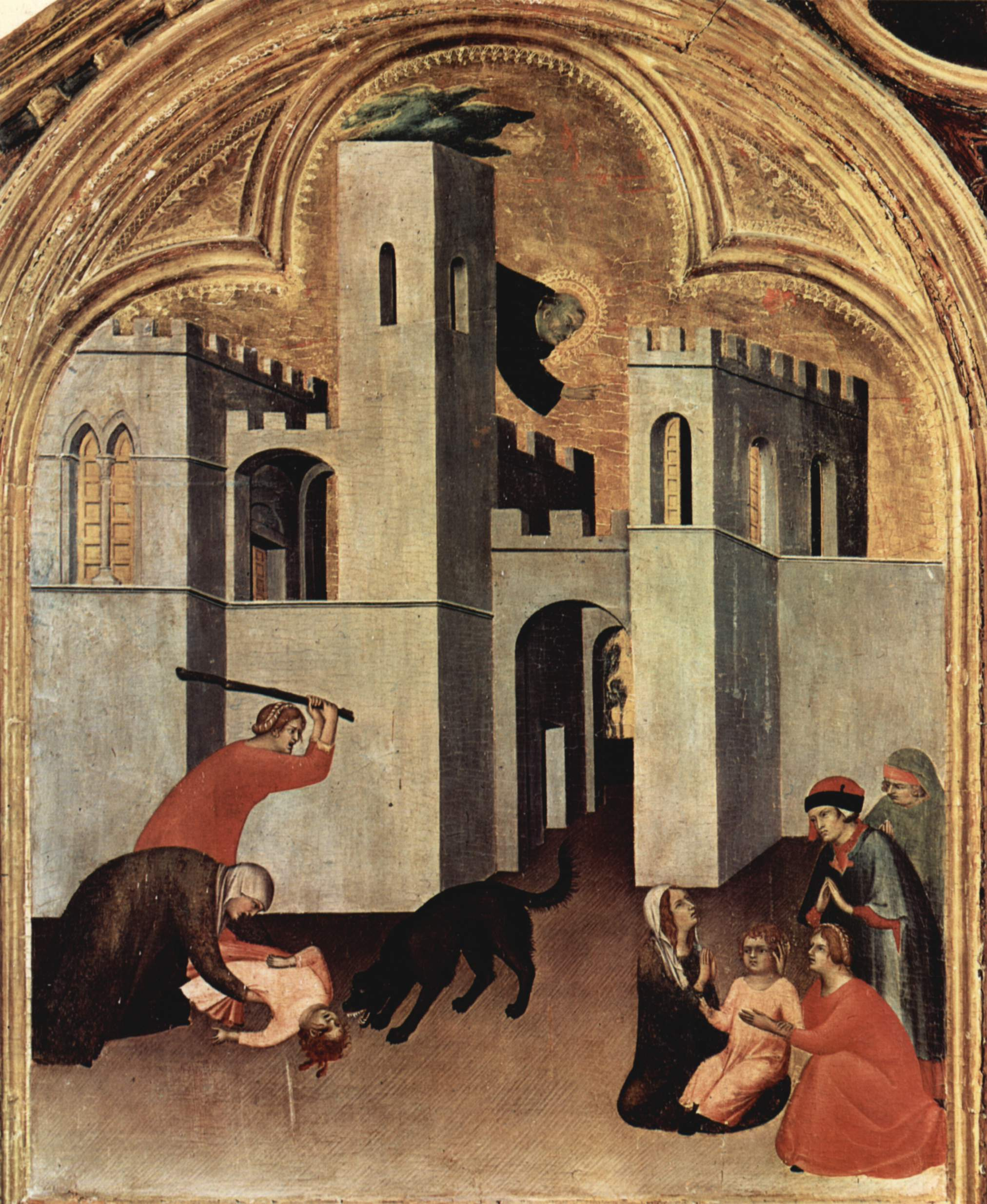
The Miracle of the Child Attacked and Rescued from the Blessed Agostino Novello Triptych, c. 1328

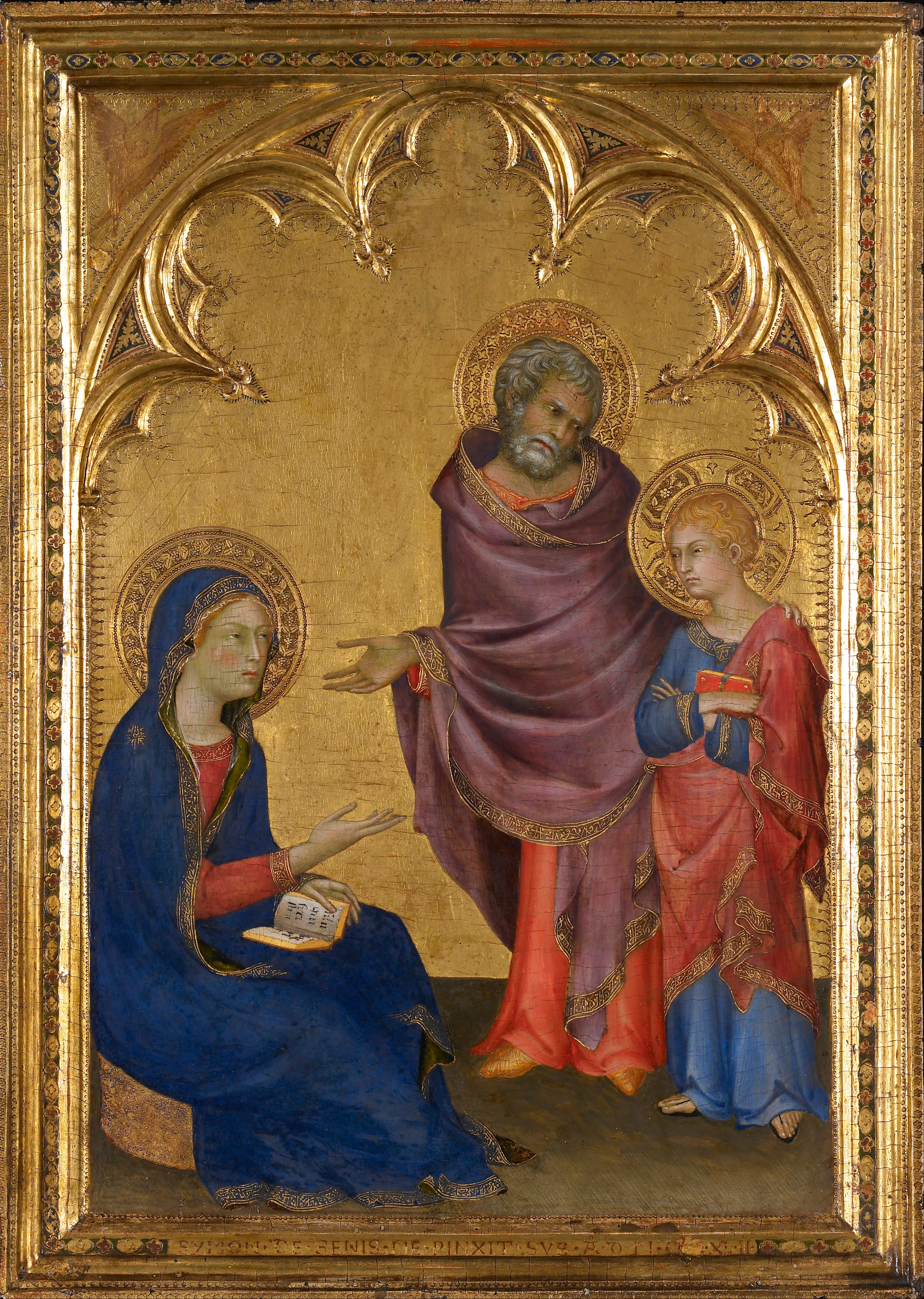
Christ Discovered in the Temple, 1342

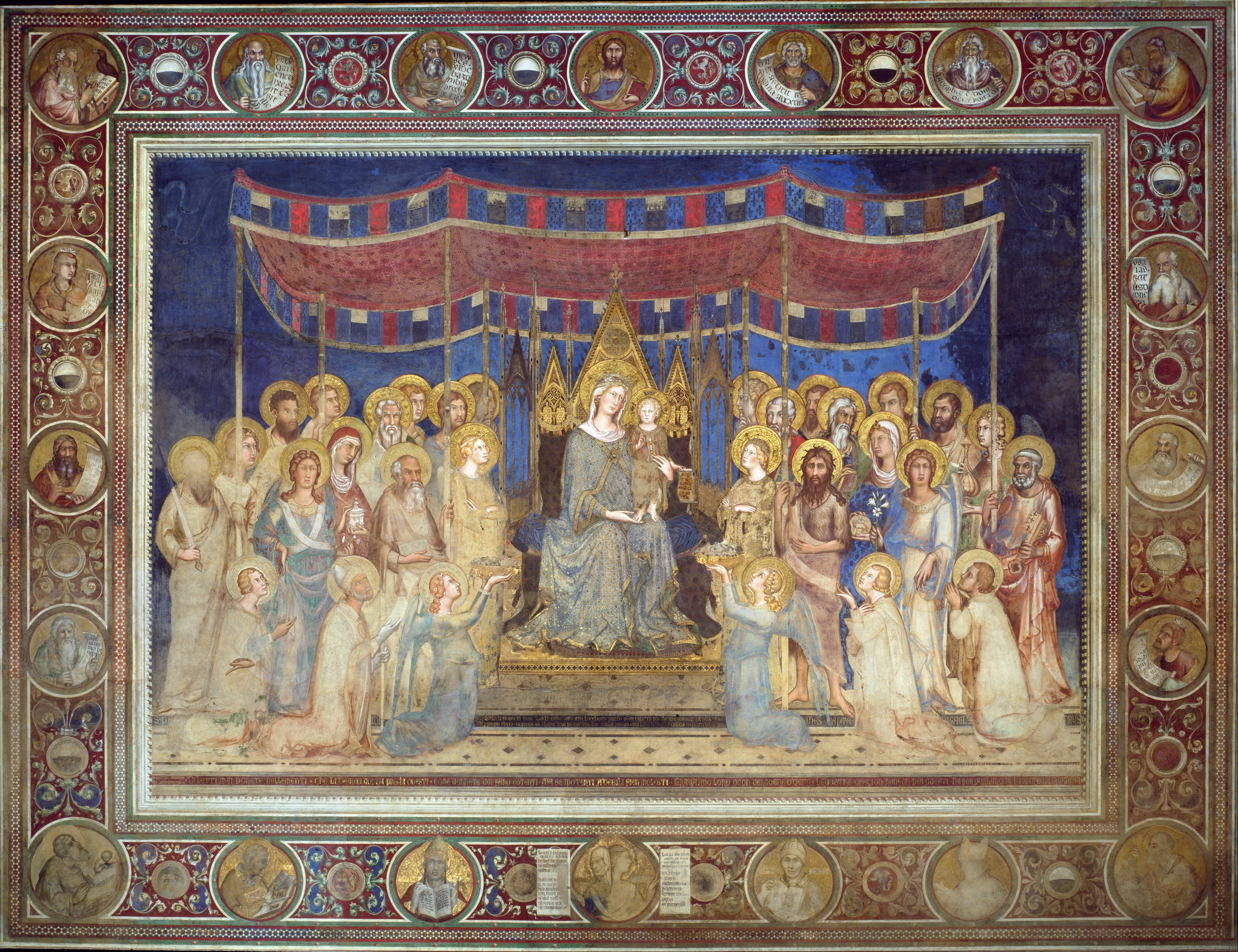
Maestà, 1315, Palazzo Pubblico, Siena

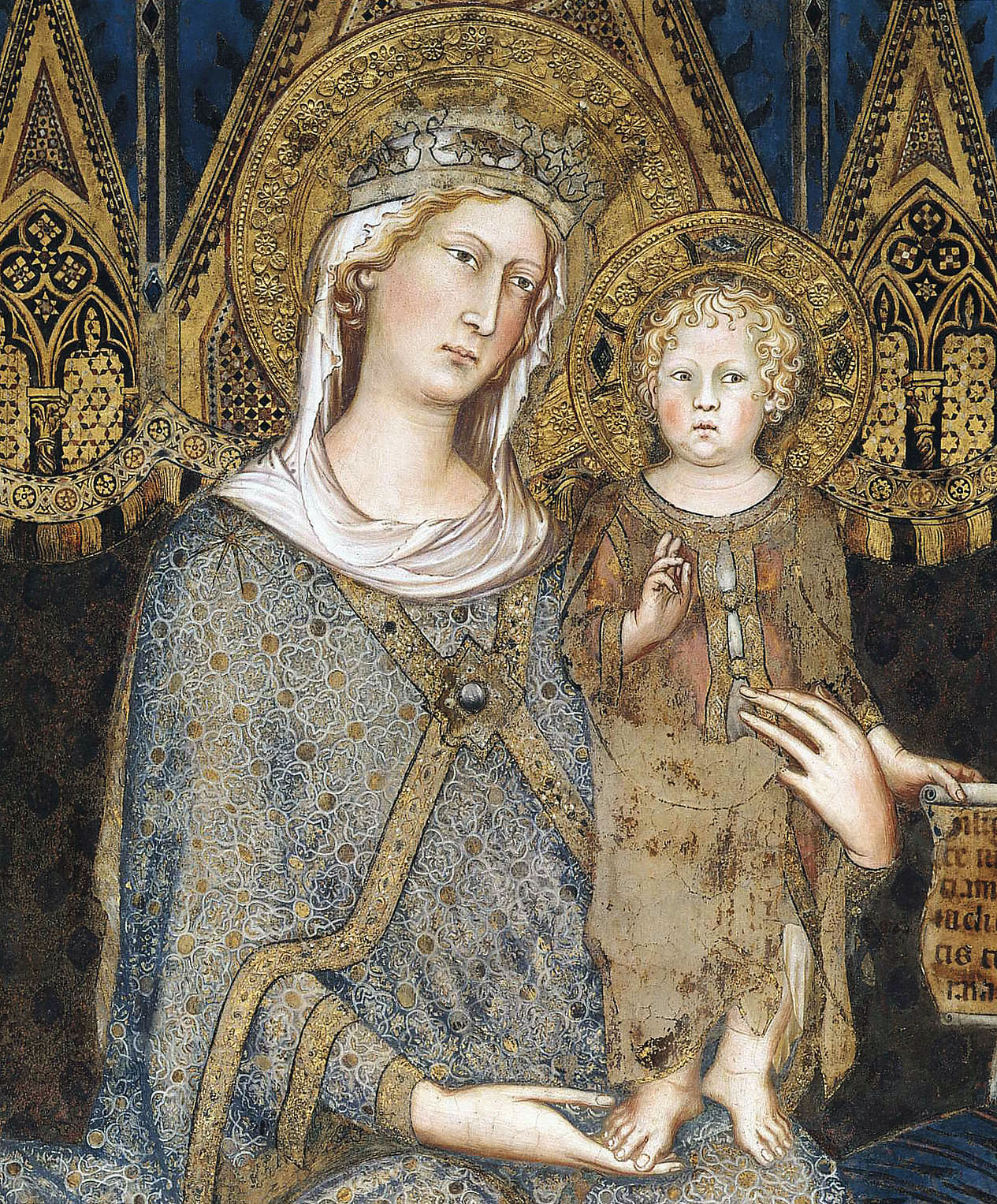
Detail of the Maesta

== See also ==
- Memmo di Filippuccio
