= Saint Catherine of Alexandria Polyptych =

Altarpiece by Simone Martini

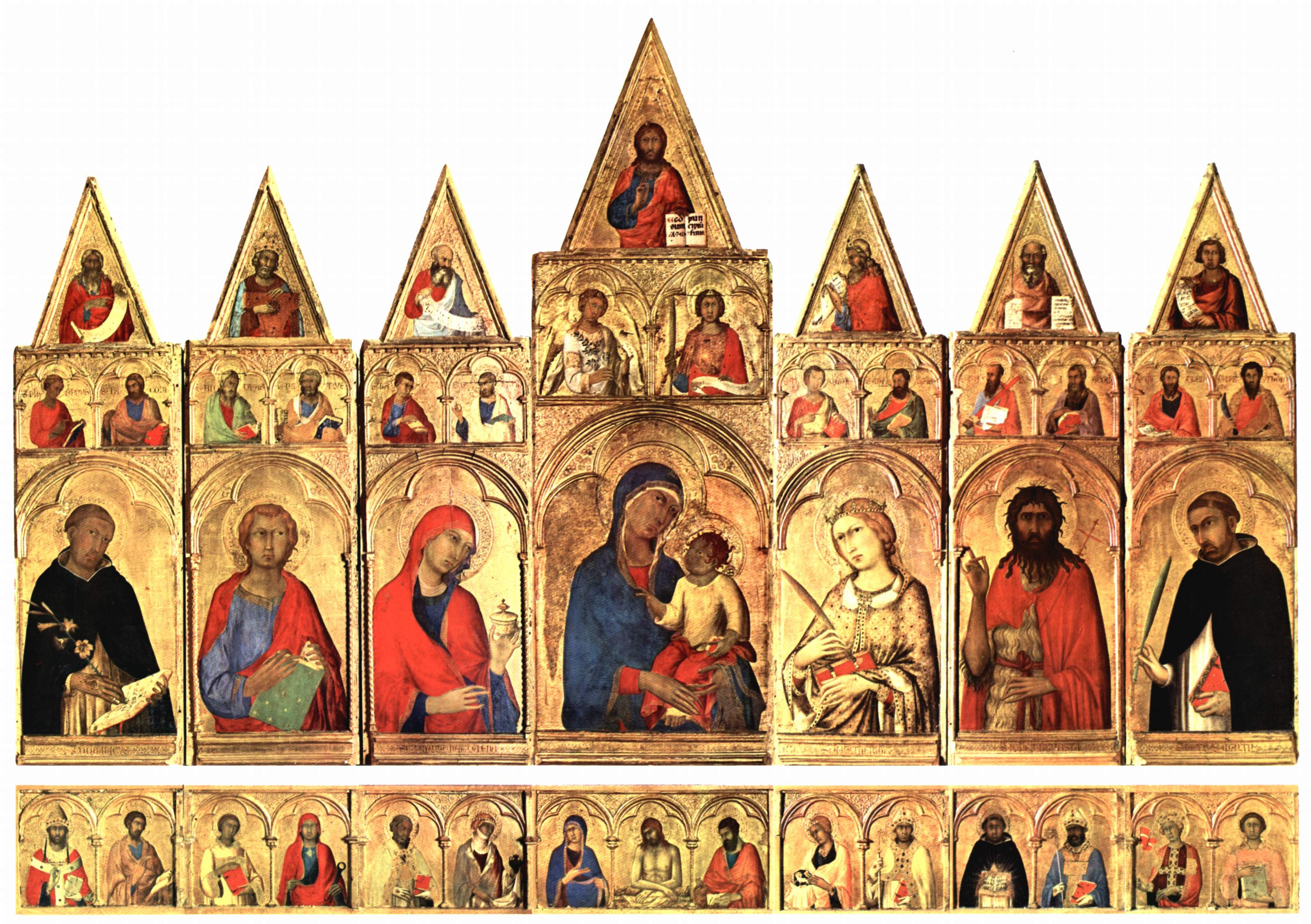
- Artist: Simone Martini
- Year: 1320
- Type: Tempera and gold on panel
- Dimensions: 95 cm × 339 cm (37 in × 133 in)
- Location: Museo nazionale di San Matteo; Pisa

The Saint Catherine of Alexandria Polyptych (also known as Pisa Polyptych) is a painting by the Italian medieval artist Simone Martini, dating to 1320. Originally placed at the high altar of the church of Santa Caterina, Pisa, it is now housed in the Museo Nazionale di San Matteo of the same city.

The work is signed SYMON DE SENIS ME PINXIT in the central panel with the Madonna and Child. According to the original convent's annals, the polyptych was placed at the altar in 1320. It was thus completed by that year, having been likely begun in 1319.

== Description ==
The polyptych is Martini's largest work, and includes numerous sub-panels. The altarpiece consists of seven main elements, each one in three parts: a cusp, a smaller panel divided into two sections, and a larger panel depicting a single saint. There is also a predella consisting of seven smaller size panels. There are 15 predella figures, an upper row with other 14 figures and seven cusps with other characters. There is a total of 44 figures.

The central panel depicts the Madonna with Child; the remaining six main panels are, from left to right, St. Dominic, St. John the Evangelist, St. Mary Magdalene, St. Catherine of Alexandria, St. John the Baptist and St. Peter of Verona. All these figures are enclosed within three foiled cusped arches. Above the Madonna are the two archangels Gabriel and Michael and, above them, the Blessing Christ. The six saints panel are surmounted by the Twelve Apostles arranged in couples, with the exception of St. John the Evangelist, replaced by St. Paul. Each apostle is carrying a copy of the Gospel and is named on the background. From left to right, Thaddaeus, Simon, Philip and James the Less, talking animatedly about the Scriptures; followed by Andrew and Peter. In the cusps, next to the Blessing Christ, are David playing the harp, Moses with the Tables of the Law and the prophets Jeremiah, Isaiah, Daniel and Ezechiel.

The predella shows, at the center, Christ in the Sepulchre with the Madonna and St. Mark and further couples of saints which, from left to right, are Gregory and Luke, Stephen and Apollonia, Jerome and Lucy, Agnes and Ambrose, Thomas of Aquino and Augustine, Ursula and Lawrence

Since the identification of the saints is controversial, the saints panels in the museum are placed differently from the image in this article.
