= Lippo Memmi =

Italian painter (c. 1291 – 1356)

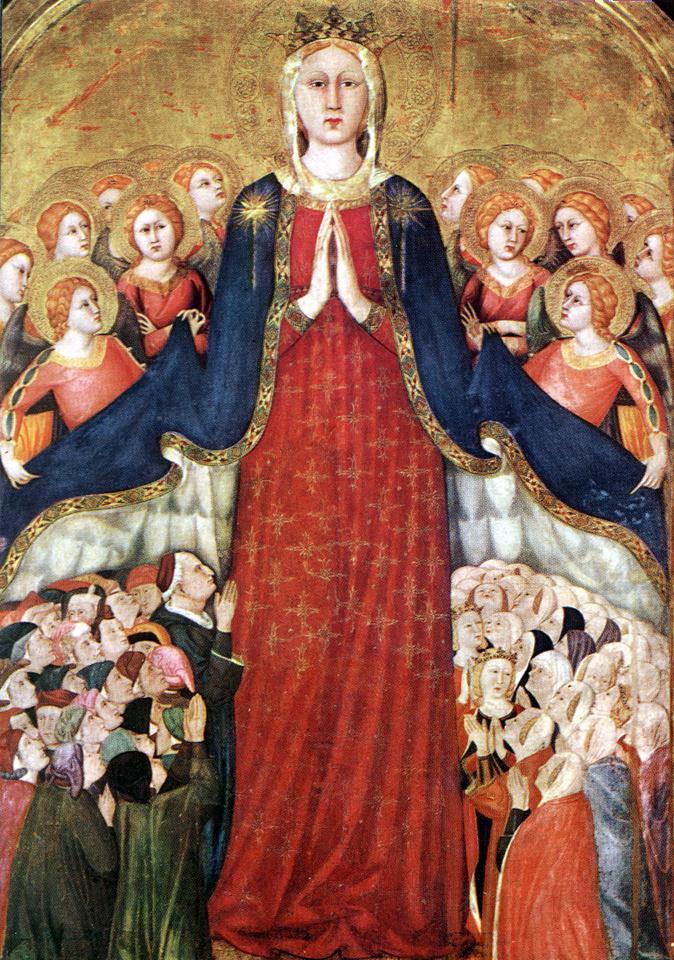
- Virgin of Mercy (Madonna dei Raccomandati), Orvieto Cathedral
- Born: c. 1291; Siena, Republic of Siena
- Died: 1356 (aged 64–65); Siena, Republic of Siena
- Occupation: Painter
- Movement: Sienese School
- Father: Memmo di Filippuccio

Lippo Memmi (c. 1291 – 1356) was an Italian painter from Siena. He was the foremost follower of Simone Martini, who was his brother-in-law.

Together with Martini, in 1333 he painted what is regarded as one of the masterworks of the International Gothic, the Annunciation with St. Margaret and St. Ansanus (now in the Uffizi), probably mainly working on the two saints. He was one of the artists who worked at Orvieto Cathedral, for which he finished the Virgin of Mercy ("Madonna dei Raccomandati"). Later he followed Martini to the Papal court in Avignon, where he worked until the mid-14th century. After his return to Siena, Memmi continued to work until his death in 1356.

Memmi's famed artwork, La Madonna della Febbre was the first venerated image of the Blessed Virgin Mary granted with a Canonical coronation by a Pope on 27 May 1631. The image has long been since held miraculous and is enshrined at the Sacristy chapel of the Blessed Sacrament inside Saint Peter's Basilica in Rome.

== Style ==
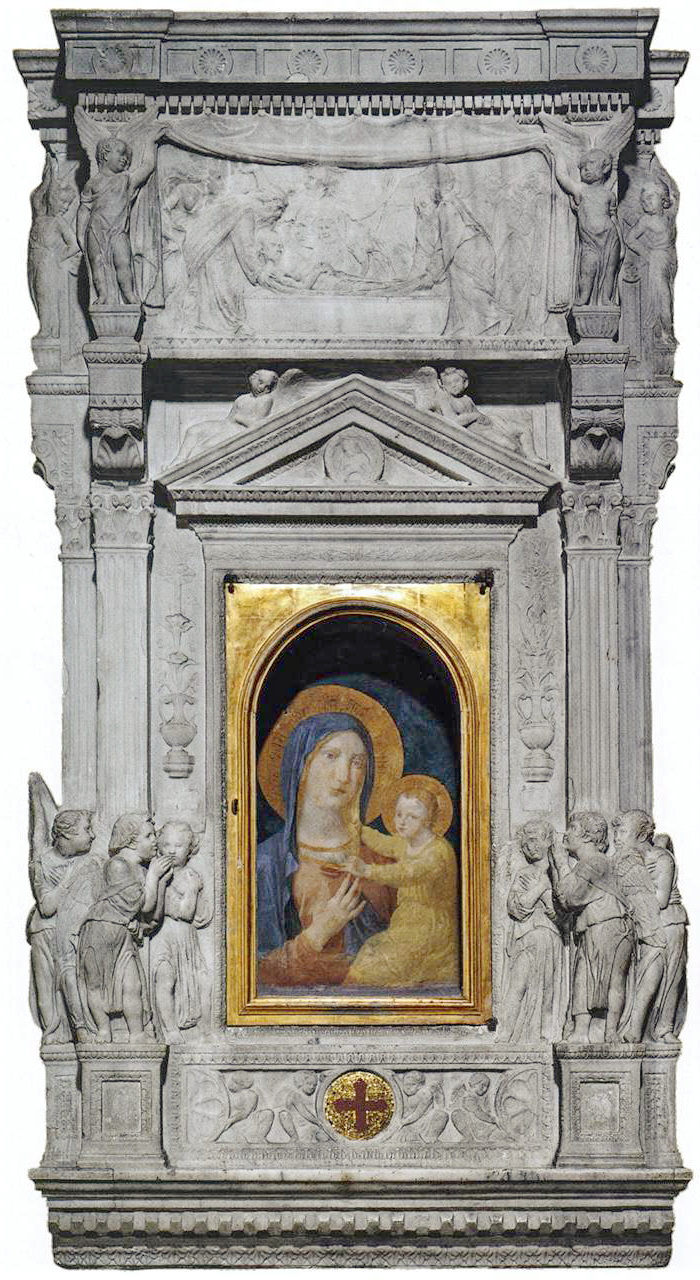
The famed Madonna della Febbre, first to be canonically crowned by Pope Urban VIII on 27 May 1631. The surrounding marble frame is a ciborium by Donatello di Bardi, Sacristy of Saint Peter's Basilica, Rome

Memmi's figures retain the static and generally frontal view found in the earlier generation of late Duecento masters such as Guido da Siena. Common features of his documented and attributed work are the sophisticated compositional arrangements, figures rendered with a striking facial roundness, narrow eyes, graceful brow lines, and elongated noses.

Memmi's figures are considered less innovative than those of his Trecento contemporaries, the sensibility of the lines used in the face and the eyes hearken back to the conventions of the Byzantine tradition. Though they demonstrate Memmi's adherence to earlier conventions of emphasizing the spiritual function of Medieval art, there are also indications of the forward-looking stylistic developments of his fellow Sienese masters. A description of his St. Agnes panel (1300–50) shows how Memmi's pictorial style was less severe and angular than the Duecento works his imagery recalled: “...has softer qualities and its spirit is tranquil”. Indeed, his depiction of emotion and realism is also subdued by this 'soft tranquility', leaving figures to read as somewhat archaic, yet projecting a dreamy quality.

Memmi is remembered for distinctive stamped tin halos with ray patterns in gold leaf. This interest in design carries over to Memmi's observation of fabric patterns and their placement. He is also known as an effective miniaturist, using sgraffito to delicately render garments as depicted in the Griggs Madonna and Child (1350) at The Metropolitan Museum of Art in New York, and the Assumption of the Virgin (1340) at the Alte Pinakothek in Munich. Memmi's interest in detail is evident in his innovative compositional devices using simple geometric shapes such as the circular arrangement of the angels in the Assumption of the Virgin.

The term “Lippesque', coined by Joseph Polzer, describes the overall effect of Memmi's visual devices found in several Madonna and Christ images. “The seated Christ Child in the central image, and especially his head which is axially and frontally ordered ... heads close to spheroid in shape and share a dominating large forehead crowned by an identical centrally located whirl of hair”. These Lippesque elements are on display in the Sienese panel S. Maria dei Servi, which Polzer uses to demonstrate Memmi's authorship of the Madonna and Child and the Coronation of the Virgin at the Gemäldegalerie, Berlin, rather than Simone Martini.

== Attribution and artistic legacy ==
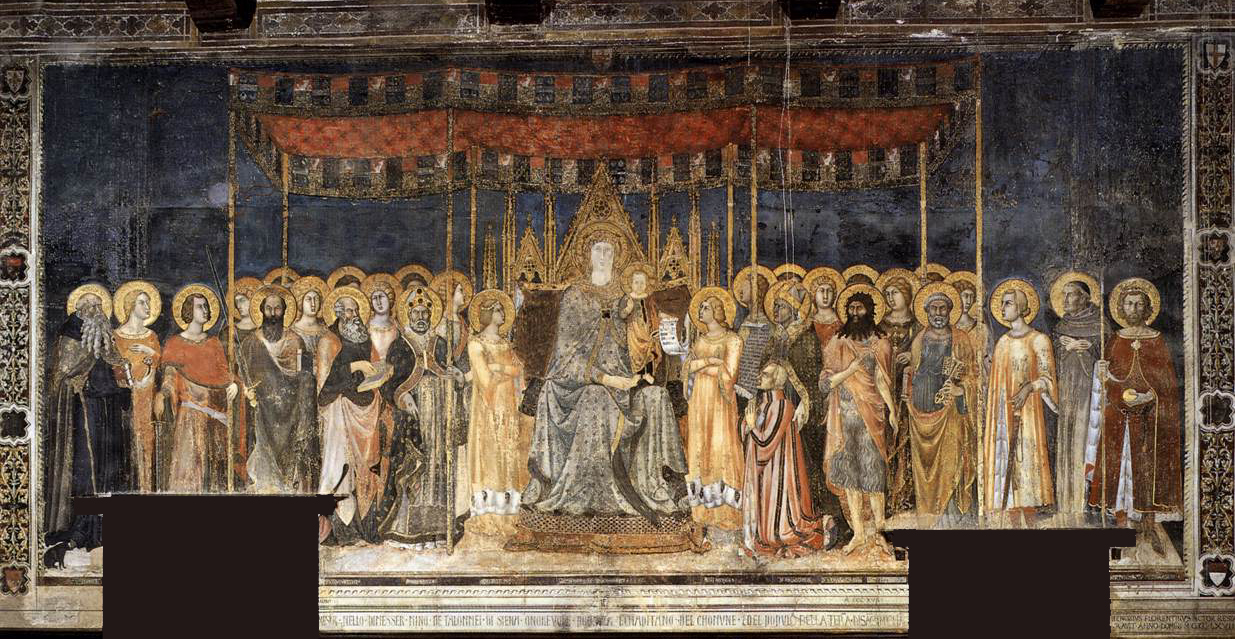
Memmi's Maestà in the Sala di Dante of the Palazzo Comunale, San Gimignano

A considerable amount of ongoing research on unsigned panels and altarpieces of early to mid-Trecento Sienese art has revealed the plausible influence of Memmi on various artists in the generation following the outbreak of the Black Death in 1348. Thus, a more complete understanding of his style and artistic achievements continues to emerge. His status as an artist of personal expression, rather than simply a craftsman and “Fratello in Arte” of his brother-in-law Simone Martini is gaining acceptance.

Research in the 1920s began to separate the works of Lippo Memmi from those of Guido da Siena. It was also accepted that an artist bearing the name Barna was a fellow student under Simone Martini and an artistic collaborator with Memmi. In attributing the panel of St. Agnes to Memmi, Heaton states that it is “...a panel endowed with unity of design and characteristics rarely found in the works of an artist not possessing a more independent, creative personality than is usually predicated of Lippo Memmi”.

The New Testament cycle of frescos in the Collegiate Church of San Gimignano, thought to date from the 1340s, are now generally attributed to Lippo Memmi. Traditionally they were attributed to Barna of Siena, but it is thought now that this artist never existed, even though the attribution dates from the writing of the Renaissance art biographer Giorgio Vasari. Vasari took the name from an earlier work by Ghiberti, but it is thought that "Barna" might have been wrongly transcribed from "Bartolo", and referred to Bartolo di Fredi who painted the Old Testament cycle in the opposite aisle of the church. This suggests that other works attributed to Barna could be works of Memmi and thus his stylistic adherence to Simone Martini is less binding.

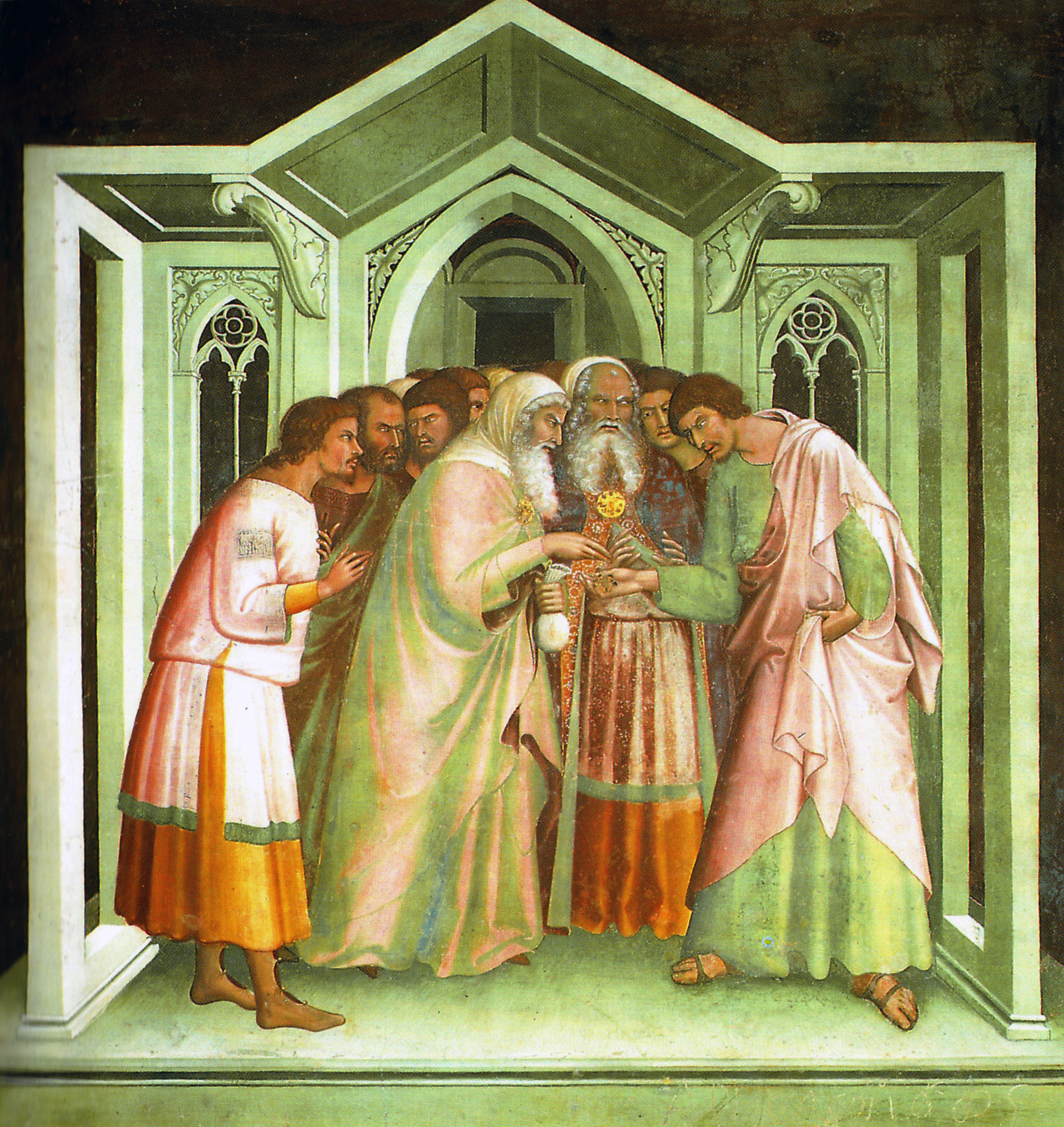
Judas receives the thirty pieces of silver, fresco, San Gimignano.

=== The Memmi workshop ===
The Memmi workshop began with Lippo's father, Memmo di Filippuccio. Its early works, such as the 1317 San Gimignano Maestà in the Palazzo Comunale, are a collaboration of the two. In the 1330s the shop produced the Orvieto Polyptych panels. Lippo's brother Federigo Memmi belonged to the shop before 1343, during the time the New Testament cycle and other works attributed to "Barna of Siena" were produced.

Simone Martini was the brother-in-law of Lippo. After Lippo returned to Siena from Avignon there is little evidence of interaction with Simone Martini. The influence of Memmi's Assumption on Naddo Ceccarelli in his Rebel Angels (another term for fallen angels) suggests a more direct stylistic connection between the ideas emerging from Lippo's shop and the younger generation of Sienese artists apprenticing under him.

=== Collaboration with Simone Martini ===
The 1333 Annunciation at the Uffizi in Florence is signed by both Lippo and Simone. Memmi's definite contribution to the panel are the halos for, and columnar renderings of St. Margaret and St. Ansanus that bookend the panel. The scribe work in the Arch Angel Michael's halo and arguably the gold leaf background were also Memmi contributions.

== Stamp work with gold leaf and tin ==
Memmi and Martini most likely settled into a familiar style in gilding patterns with the Monaldeschi altarpiece in Orvieto from about 1320 consisting of a “composite punch design of a quatrefoil set about a central rosette”. His most identifiable device is found in the alternating long and short lines depicting light emanating from the halos of saints and angels, most famously recognized in the Annunciation, yet we see this in works throughout his career such as the Virgin and Child in New York, the Virgin of Humility in Berlin, and his small Maesta in the San Domenico cloister in Siena.

Memmi's Maestà at San Gimignano is striking in the various methods of pastiglia and gilding work used. Golden tin on the throne cusps, laminated tin with gold foil for the halos which are carefully rendered with intricate punchwork, his application of these materials described as “a neat perfection rarely encountered elsewhere”. Examination of the motifs and degree of complexity in the punchwork has allowed historians to recognize the hand of Lippo Memmi and gives a clearer idea of his place in collaborations with Simone Martini. Stamp designs, gilding and the execution of rayed halos are similar, yet show that Lippo Memmi's mature gild and scribe work patterns in the 1317 San Gimignano Maestà are rooted in the simpler patterns and less developed line he applied to Martini's Maestà of 1315 at the Palazzo Pubblico in Siena.

== Works ==
- Madonna Enthroned with Child and Saints – Frescoes, Church of Sant'Agostino, San Gimignano
- Madonna Enthroned with Child, St. Paul and an Angel – Detached fresco, 130 x 308 cm, Pinacoteca Nazionale, Siena
- Madonna Enthroned with Child and Saints – Signed panel, Lindenau-Museum, Altenburg
- Madonna Enthroned with Child, Angels and Saints (also known as San Gimignano Maestà, 1317) - Signed fresco, Palazzo del Popolo, San Gimignano
- Madonna with Child and Donor – 56 x 24 cm, National Gallery of Art, Washington
- Polyptych of San Paolo a Ripa d'Arno: side panel with St. Mary Magdalene, Musée du Petit Palais, Avignon
- Madonna with Child and Saints – 34 x 25 cm, Isabella Stewart Gardner Museum, Boston
- Virgin of Mercy (Madonna dei Raccomandati, c. 1320) – Cathedral of Orvieto
- Madonna with Child and Saints Polyptych – Church of San Niccolò, Casciana Alta
- Dismantled polyptych for the church of San Francesco of Colle Val d'Elsa (c. 1330–1340) – Panels in several museum, including Berlin's Gemäldegalerie, the National Gallery of Art in Washington, the Musée du Louvre in Paris, and the Museo Poldi Pezzoli in Milan
- Madonna with Child (Madonna of the People, c. 1325–1330) – 78 x 51 cm, Santa Maria dei Servi, Siena
- Signed and dated diptych (1333):
  - Madonna and Child – Gemäldegalerie, Berlin
  - St. John the Baptist – 44 x 21 cm, W.B. Golovin Collection, New York
- Madonna with Child – 50 x 39 cm, Nelson-Atkins Museum of Art, Kansas City
- Blessing Redeemer – Unknown location, last mention in Turin in 1987
- Madonna with Child and Christ the Redeemer – Panel, 149 x 57 cm, Pinacoteca Nazionale, Siena
- Madonna with Child (Madonna of the Humility) – 33 x 24 cm, Gemäldegalerie, Berlin
- Madonna Enthroned with Child and Donor (c. 1325–1330) – 78 x 51 cm, Diocesan Museum, Asciano
- Polyptych of Saints
  - St. John the Baptist – Lindenau-Museum, Altenburg
  - St. Peter and St. Paul – Collezione Chiaramonte Bordonaro, Palermo
  - St. James – Museo Nazionale di San Matteo, Pisa
- Dismantled diptych (c. 1330–1340)
  - Crucifixion – 60 x 29 cm, Louvre, Paris
  - Madonna with Child, Angels and Sts. John the Baptist and Francis of Assisi – 67 x 33 cm, The Metropolitan Museum of Art, New York
- Polyptych pinnacle with st. Anthony of Padua – 41 x 19 cm, Frick Collection, New York
- Apotheosis of St. Catherine – Convent of Santa Caterina, Pisa
- Triumph of St Thomas Aquinas, (1323) Santa Caterina, Pisa
- Altarpiece of Five Saints (c. 1330) – 200 x 200 cm, Presidential Commission on Good Government (on loan to the UP Vargas Museum, Quezon City)
- Stories of the New Testament (c. 1338 – 1345) – Fresco cycle, Collegiata di San Gimignano

== Sources ==
- Freuler, Gaudenz (1986). "Lippo Memmi's New Testament Cycle in the Collegiata in San Gimignano". Arte Cristiana (74): 93–102.
- Henniker-Heaton, Raymond (1925). "Two Early Sienese Paintings". The Burlington Magazine for Connoisseurs. 47 (263): 18. JSTOR 862528.
- Mallory, Michael (1974). "An Altarpiece by Lippo Memmi Reconsidered". Metropolitan Museum Journal (9): 187–202.
- Meiss, Millard (1977). "Notes on a Dated Diptych by Lippo Memmi". Scritti di Storia dell'Arte in Onore di Ugo Procacci. pp. 137–139.
- Poltzer, Joseph (December 1981). "The Master of the Rebel Angels Reconsidered". The Art Bulletin. 63 (4): 563–584. JSTOR 3050164.
- Poltzer, Joseph (1999). "A Sienese Painting in the Gemaldegalerie, Berlin". Jahrbuch der Berliner Museen. 41: 37–45. JSTOR 4126005.
- Tintori, Leonetto (1982). "'Golden Tin' in Sienese Murals of the Early Trecento". The Burlington Magazine. 124 (947): 94. JSTOR 880572.
- Wieruzowski, Helene (1944). "Art and the Commune in the Time of Dante". Speculum. 19 (1): 14. JSTOR 2856851.
