= Memmo di Filippuccio =

14th-century Italian painter

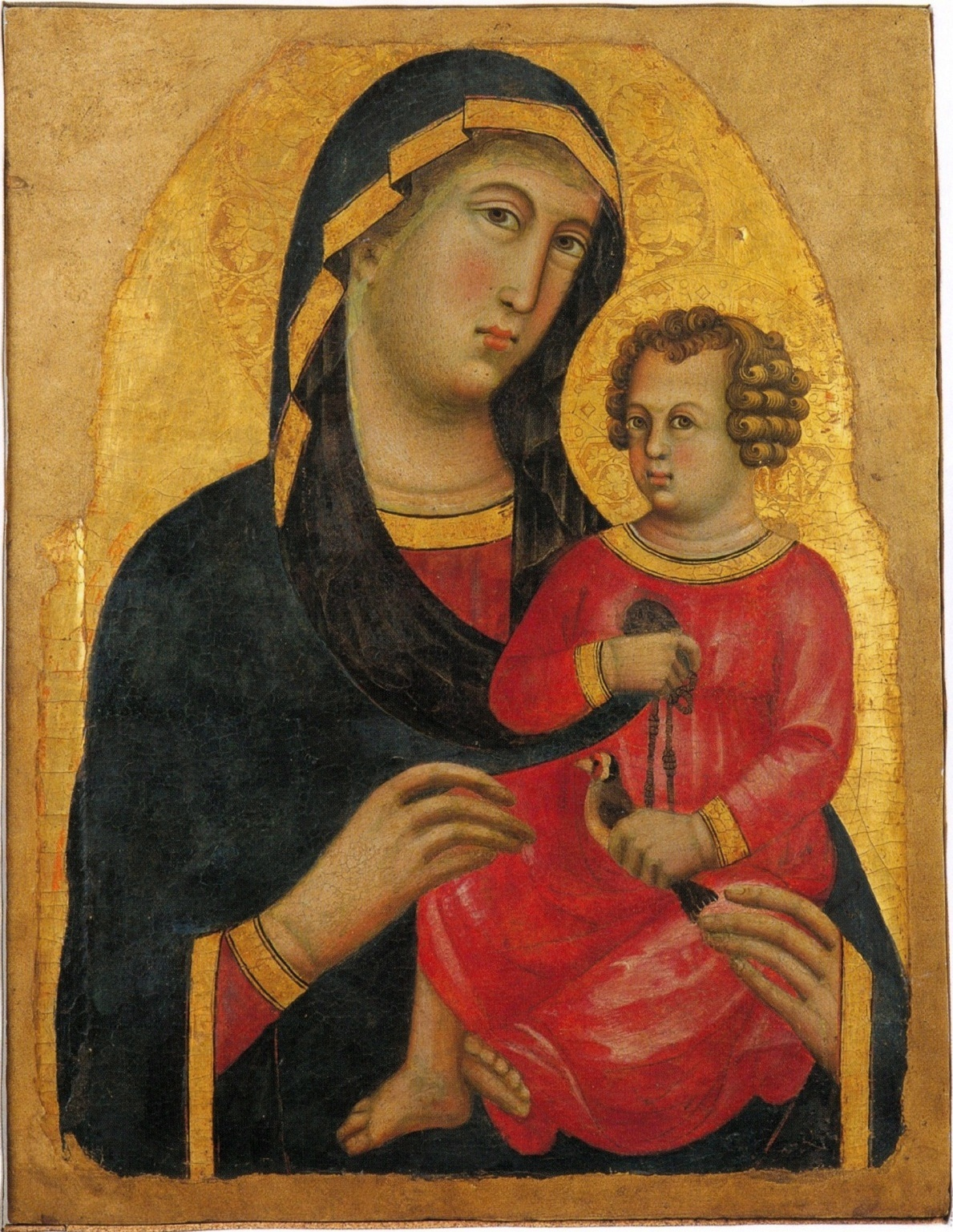
Madonna and Christ Child, National Museum of San Matteo, Pisa

Memmo di Filippuccio (fl. 1303–1345) was an Italian painter from Siena.

== Biography ==
Memmo di Filippuccio is mentioned in the municipal records as painting several works at the Town Hall of San Gimignano in 1303. The frescoed decorations are in the mayoral chamber and show scenes of everyday life. The best known of the frescos are two scenes of domestic bliss. The first shows a husband and wife taking a bath together in a large tub, surrounded by a striped screen and attended by a maid, The second scene shows the bedroom with the maid holding back the curtains to reveal the wife in bed while her husband pulls back the covers to climb in bedside her. These frescos "are among the most frequently reproduced documents used to illustrates daily life.... of the early 14th century." Memmo was given a house and workshop in San Gimignano.

Memmo had two sons who were painters, Lippo Memmi and Federico Memmi. His son-in-law was Simone Martini, one of the most outstanding and influential painters of Siena. In 1317, Lippo di Memmi received a commission to paint a large Maesta in the main chamber of the Town Hall. It is thought that Memmo assisted his son with this work. Memmo may also have worked with Lippo Memmi on the fresco cycle of the New Testament in the Collegiate Church of San Gimignano, completed around 1345. These frescos have long been ascribed to "Barna of Siena" but are now believed to be the work of Lippo di Memmi and workshop.

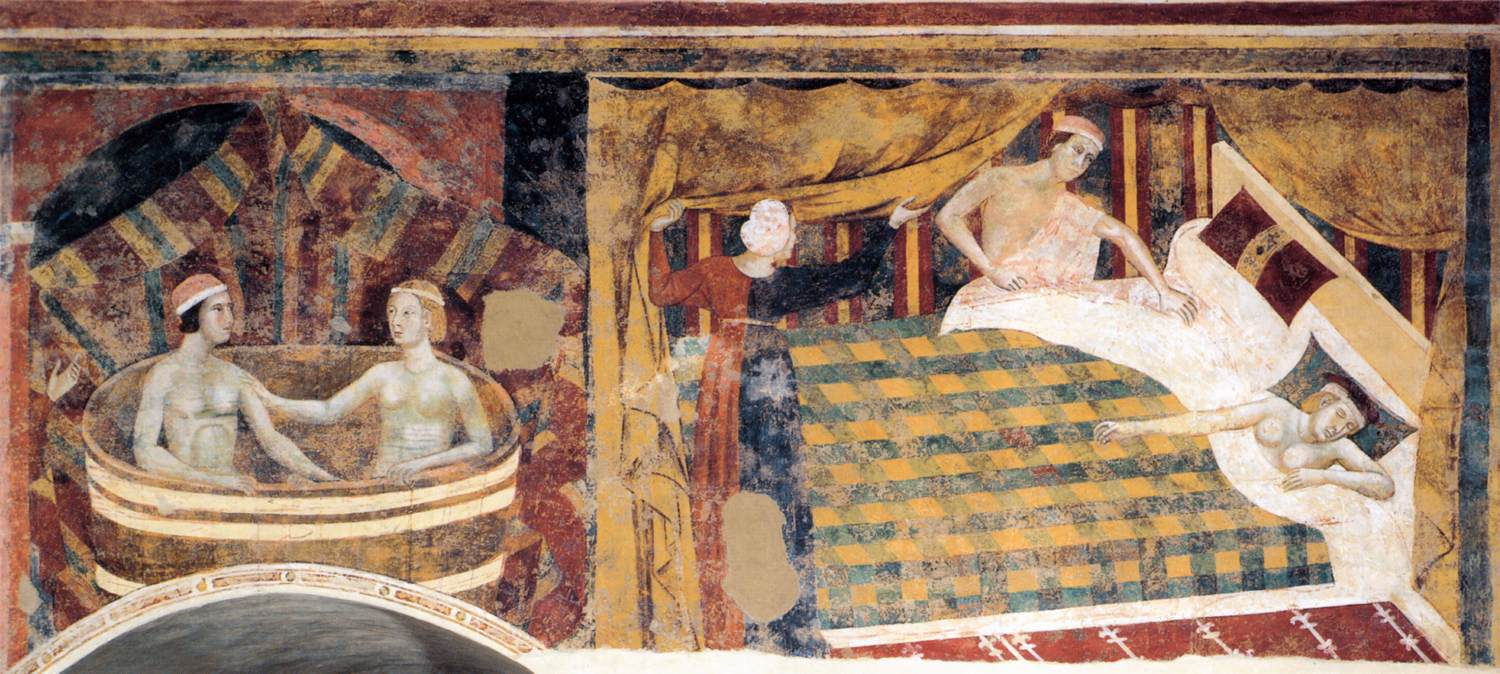
Scenes of Married Life, Palazzo del Podestà, San Gimignano

== See also ==
- Collegiate Church of San Gimignano
- Duccio
- Cimabue
- Giotto
