= Triumph of Saint Thomas Aquinas =

Painting by Lippo Memmi

Triumph of St Thomas Aquinas
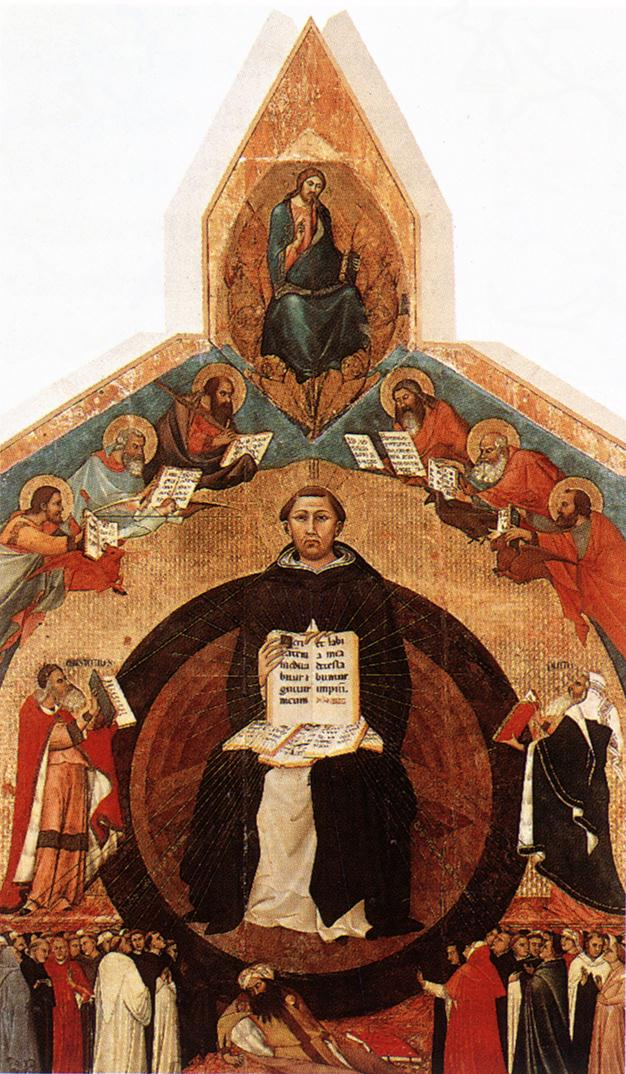
- Artist: Lippo Memmi
- Year: 1323
- Location: Santa Caterina; Pisa

The Triumph of St Thomas Aquinas is a painting by the Italian medieval artist Lippo Memmi, dating likely to 1323, when the former Dominican friar was canonized. It is displayed in the church of Santa Caterina in Pisa, a church once belonging to the Dominican order.

== Description ==
The painting is a complex arrangement exalting the role of Thomas Aquinas as a scholar of religious knowledge, his placement among the Four Evangelists and philosophers. In the center of the panel, the largest figure is the seated tonsured monk St Thomas Aquinas, below a Christ inside a mandorla. Linear rays tie his work to the Four Evangelists and Moses and St Paul above the gilded circle. Flanking him are Aristotle and Plato.

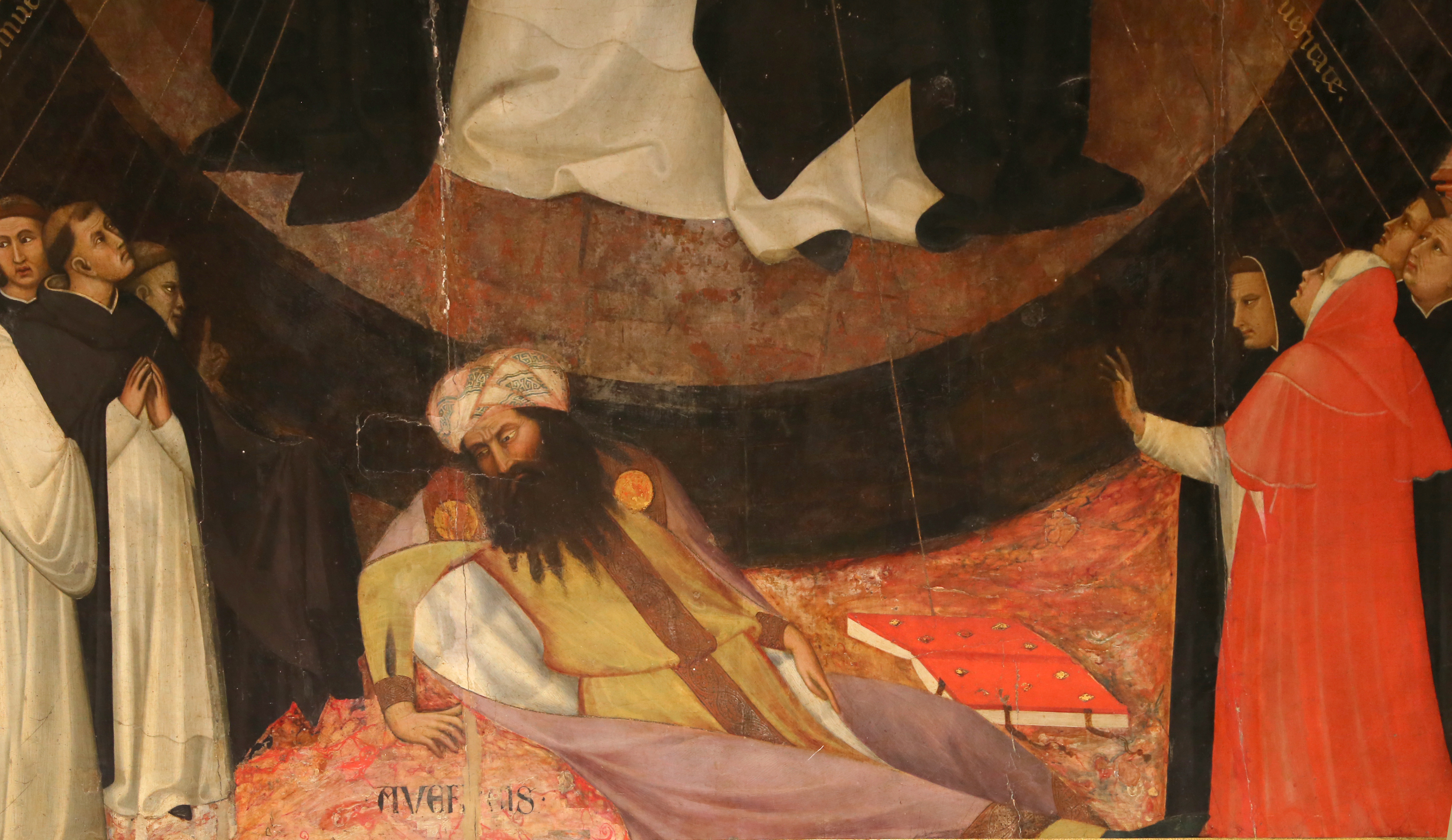
Averroes and figures in lower register

A guide from 1867, while erroneously attributing the painting to Taddeo Gaddi, describes some of the contents including the quote from Proverbs 8:7, which Aquinas used to introduce his Summa contra gentiles

"Wherefore I prayed, and understanding was given me: I called upon God, and the Spirit of Wisdom came to me. I preferred her before sceptres and thrones, and esteemed riches nothing in comparison of her."

Below the feet of Aquinas is a dejected Averroes, horizontal and looks away with book inverted. The guide provides a long elaboration of the lower figures, but careful examination fails to identify many of the attributes described. The figures likely represent monks and nuns of the Catholic orders, inspired by the words of Aquinas.
