= Coppo di Marcovaldo =

13th-century Florentine painter

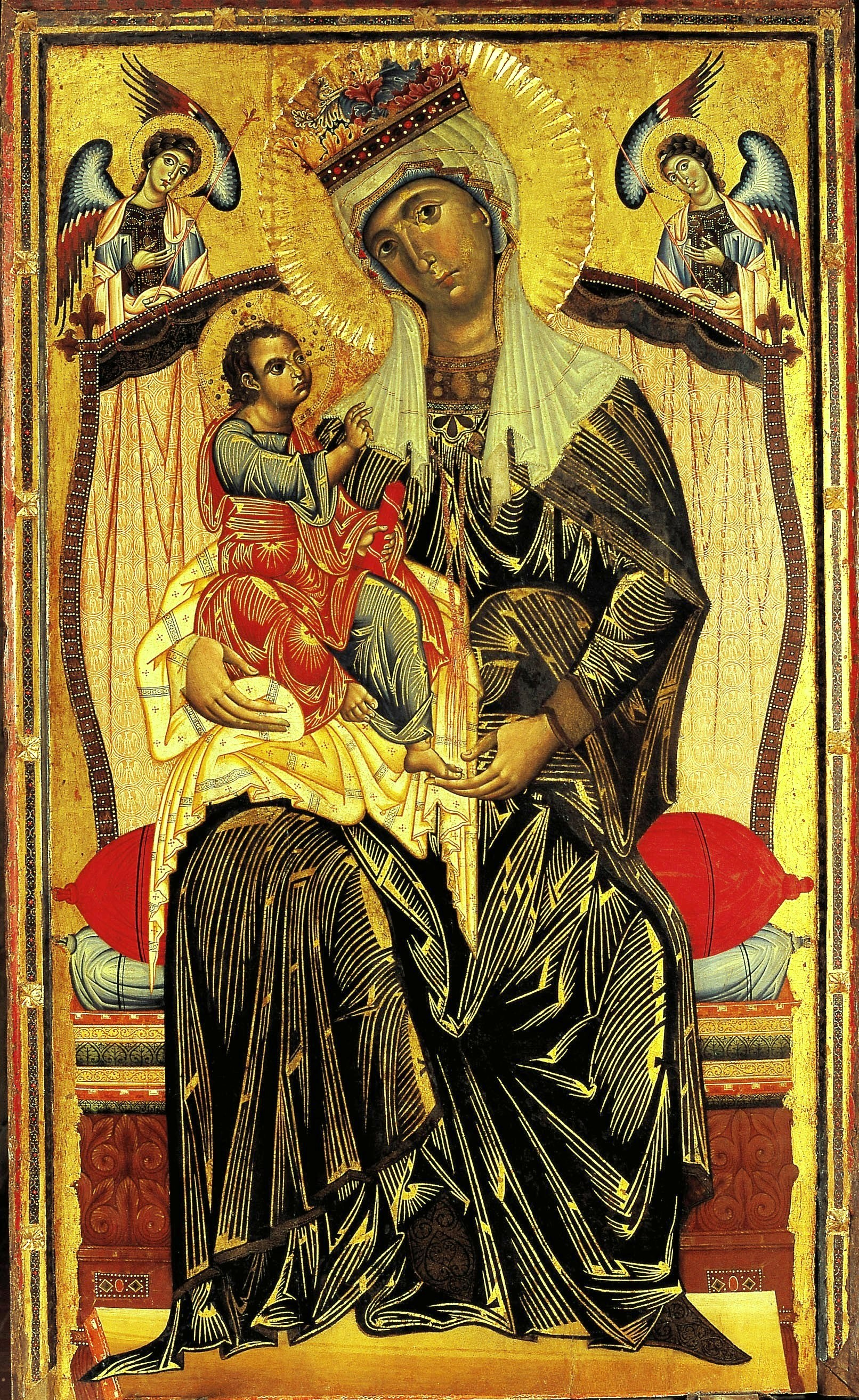
Coppo di Marcovaldo Madonna and Child. c. 1265. Panel. St. Martino dei Servi, Orvieto.

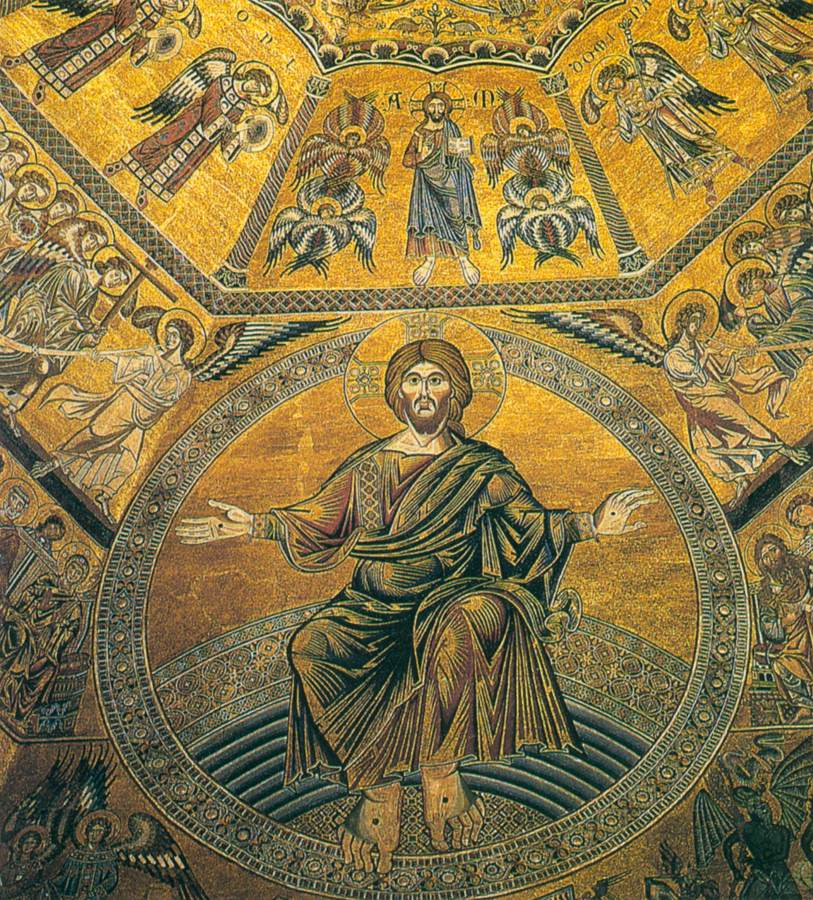
Attributed to Coppo di Marcovaldo - Mosaic on the vault (Detail of Christ). Second half of thirteenth century. Baptistery, Florence.

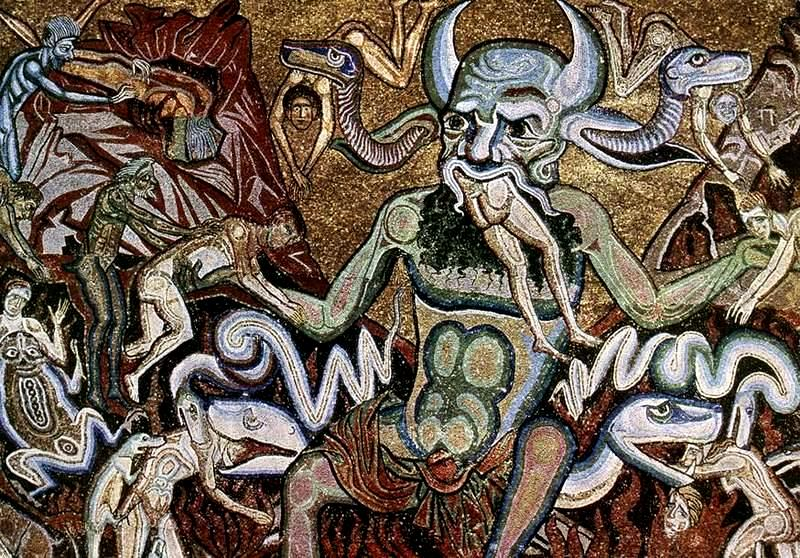
Mosaic on the vault (Detail of the Hell Scene), Baptistery, Florence.

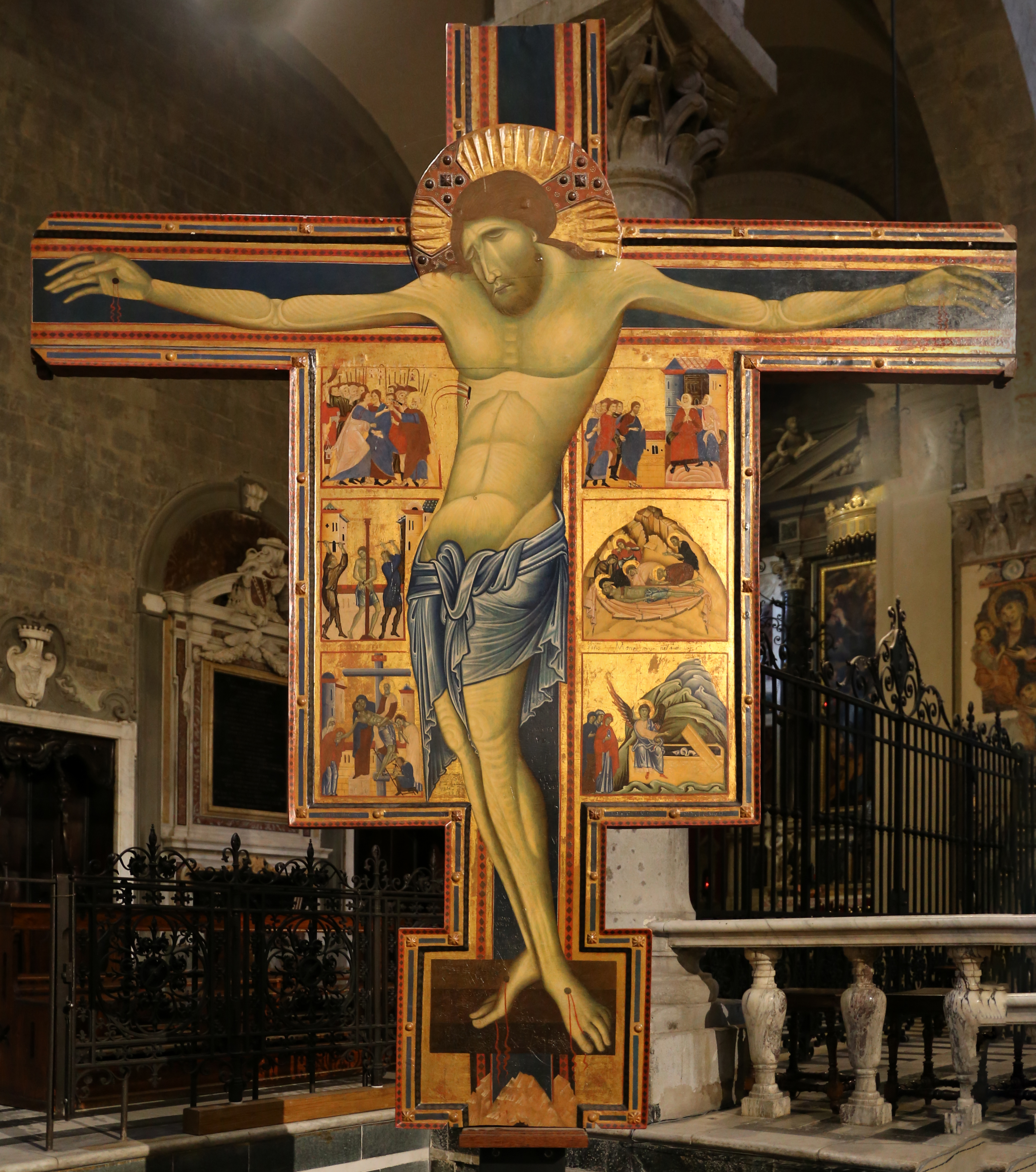
Crucifix of San Zeno, Pistoia Cathedral

Coppo di Marcovaldo (c. 1225 – c. 1276) was a Florentine painter in the Italo-Byzantine style, active in the middle of the thirteenth century, whose fusion of both the Italian and Byzantine styles had great influence on generations of Italian artists.

== Biography ==
Coppo di Marcovaldo is one of the better-known Duecento artists and is the first Florentine artist whose name and works are well-documented. One of the earliest references to Coppo is found in the Book of Montaperti, where his name is listed among Florentines soldiers for the war with Siena, which ended at the Battle of Montaperti on September 4, 1260. It is speculated by many historians that Coppo was taken prisoner by the Sienese where he was then held at the church of Santa Maria dei Servi. It was here in 1261 that he painted his most famous work The Madonna del Bordone for the order of the Servites. Assumed to be a prisoner of war, the question is raised as to why a Florentine artist was asked to execute such an important Sienese painting. It must be assumed that Coppo was already well known and highly regarded at this time for the Sienese to have commissioned him within a year of the bloody conflict with Florence.

== Madonna del Bordone ==
The Madonna del Bordone is the only surviving documented work by Coppo and it is believed that his signature and the date were still visible on the painting around 1625. The panel of the painting is unusually large for the time measuring 220 cm x 125 cm, approximately 7 ft x 4 ft. The painting depicts the Virgin and Child sitting on a high-backed throne. The Virgin looks at the viewer, although her body is slightly turned to the left and her head is bent towards the Child. Coppo is now widely accepted as the first to employ the angled throne in the representation of the Virgin and Child. The clothing, different than the traditional Byzantine art style, is of northern origin and perhaps is the first time to be used in Tuscan painting. Seen as well for the first time in Tuscan painting are a number of iconographic features. The Child’s bare arms and feet, the gesture of the Virgin’s touch to her child’s right foot, the sash of the Child’s garments, and the fabric on which the Child sits are all linked to Christ’s Passion and to the Virgin, themes very important to the Servite patrons. Extensive gilding has been used as well as a gold leaf background, both typical of the Sienese style. In his work, Coppo used the method ‘tecnica a velatura,’ in which he began by laying down the purest colors, which were then covered by tinted varnishes and glazes which helped to evoke a sense of volume.

== Style ==
It is evident that this Florentine artist studied during his time in Siena suggested by his later use of a more balanced space, graceful poses and gestures, and an interest in varied textures – all elements derived from Sienese painting. As well, Coppo was strongly influenced by the Byzantine style characterized by its emphasis on light, shadow, and volume that in combination was used to create the illusion of life. The composition and style employed in the rendering of clothing, as seen in bulky and stiffly pleated cloth in Madonna del Bordone, is reminiscent of Romanesque figure sculptures.

== Attributed works ==
Although the Madonna del Bordone is Coppo’s only surviving work today, there are many other works attributed to the artist.

• 1261 – Madonna del Bordone in the Sta. Maria dei Servi at Siena.

• 1265 – Pistoia frescos in the chapel of St. James in the Cathedral of S. Zeno.

• 1265–68 – Madonna and Child in Sta. Maria dei Servi at Orvieto.

• 1265–70 – Last Judgment mosaic at the Baptistery of Florence Cathedral.

• 1274 – Crucifix in the Cathedral of Pistoia.
