= Santa Maria dei Servi (Siena) =

- Basilica of San Clemente in Santa Maria dei Servi
- Basilica di San Clemente in Santa Maria dei Servi
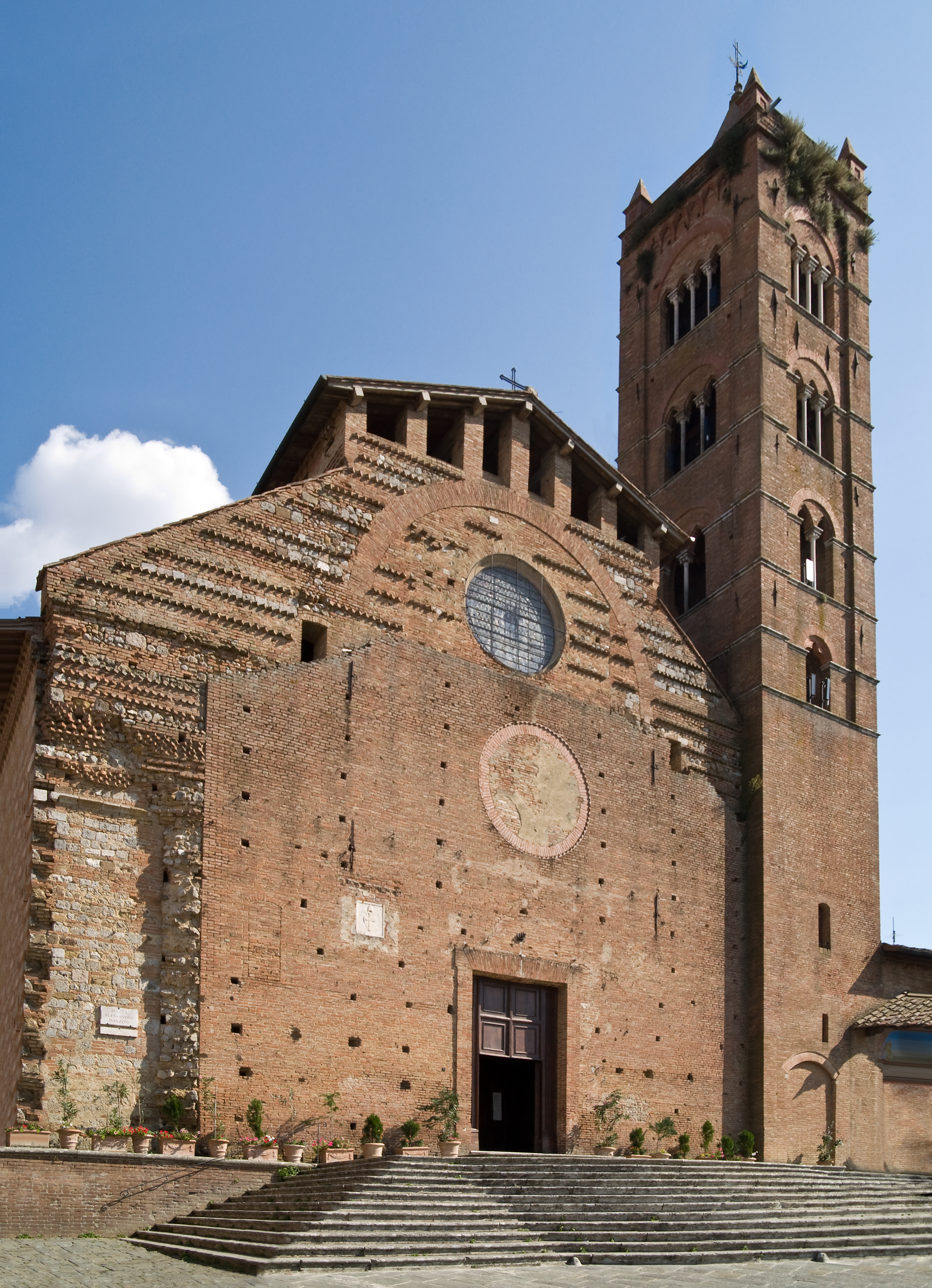

- Location in Siena, Italy
- 43.315327°N 11.338174°E
- Location: Siena, Tuscany
- Country: Italy
- Denomination: Roman Catholic
- Tradition: Latin Rite

History
- Status: Cathedral, minor basilica
- Consecrated: 1533

Architecture
- Architectural type: Church
- Completed: 1537

The Church of Santa Maria dei Servi is a Romanesque style, Roman Catholic church in the Terzo of San Martino in the city of Siena, Tuscany, Italy.

== History ==
The church is built on the site of the former Church of San Clement, which was acquired by the Servite order in the Medieval era. The original Basilica was built in the 13th century, but later underwent reconstruction and transformation which continued until the 15th-16th century.

== Exterior ==
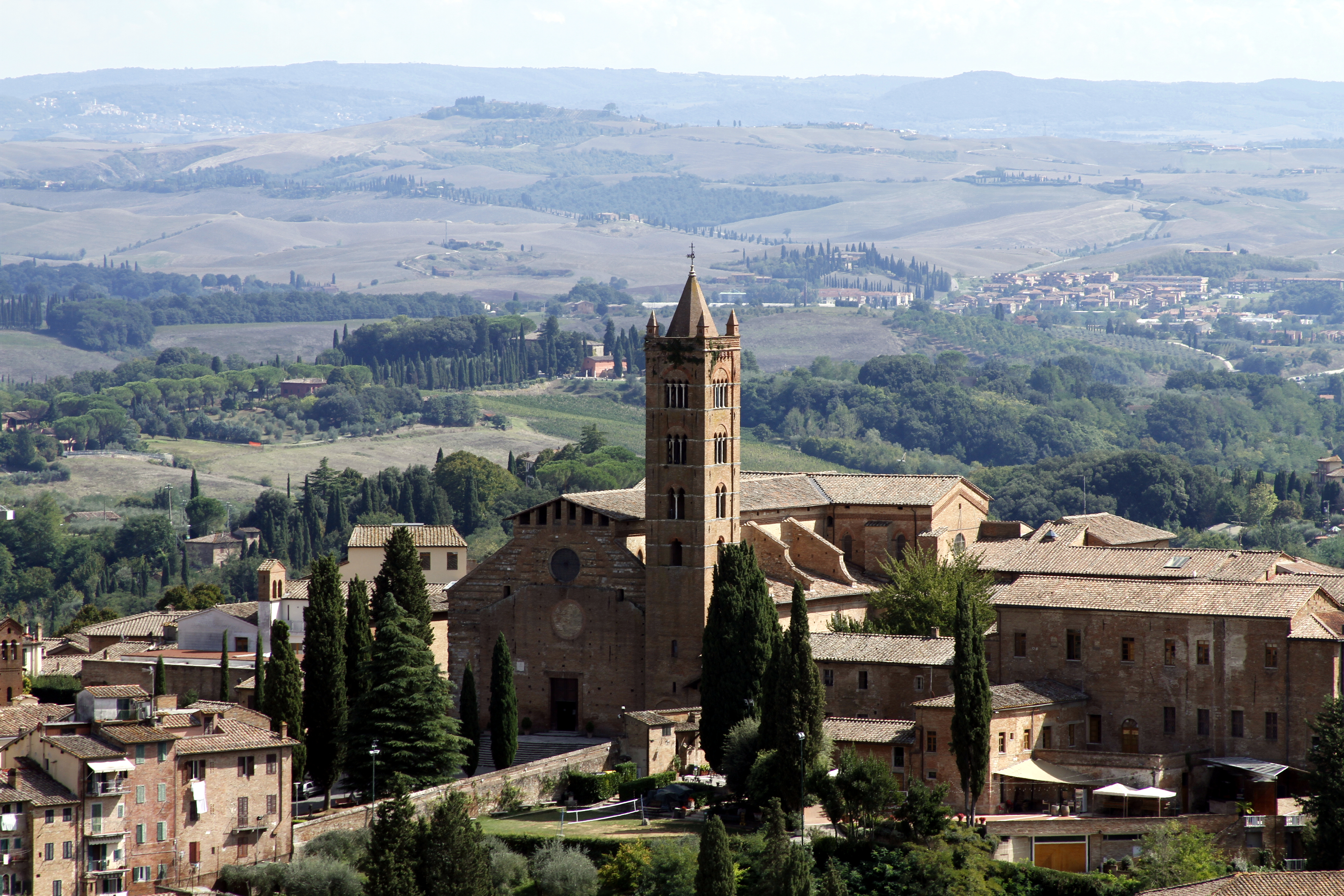
Exterior

The façade is simple and unadorned, with a single doorway and a rose window (indications of another can be discerned on the wall). It is in the Romanesque period style

The adjoining Campanile is likewise of the 13th century, richly embellished by four orders of windows. It was entirely restored in the 20th century. The church building stands atop it is cook entrance stairs, with views over the Duomo and the Palazzo Publico of Siena.

== Interior ==
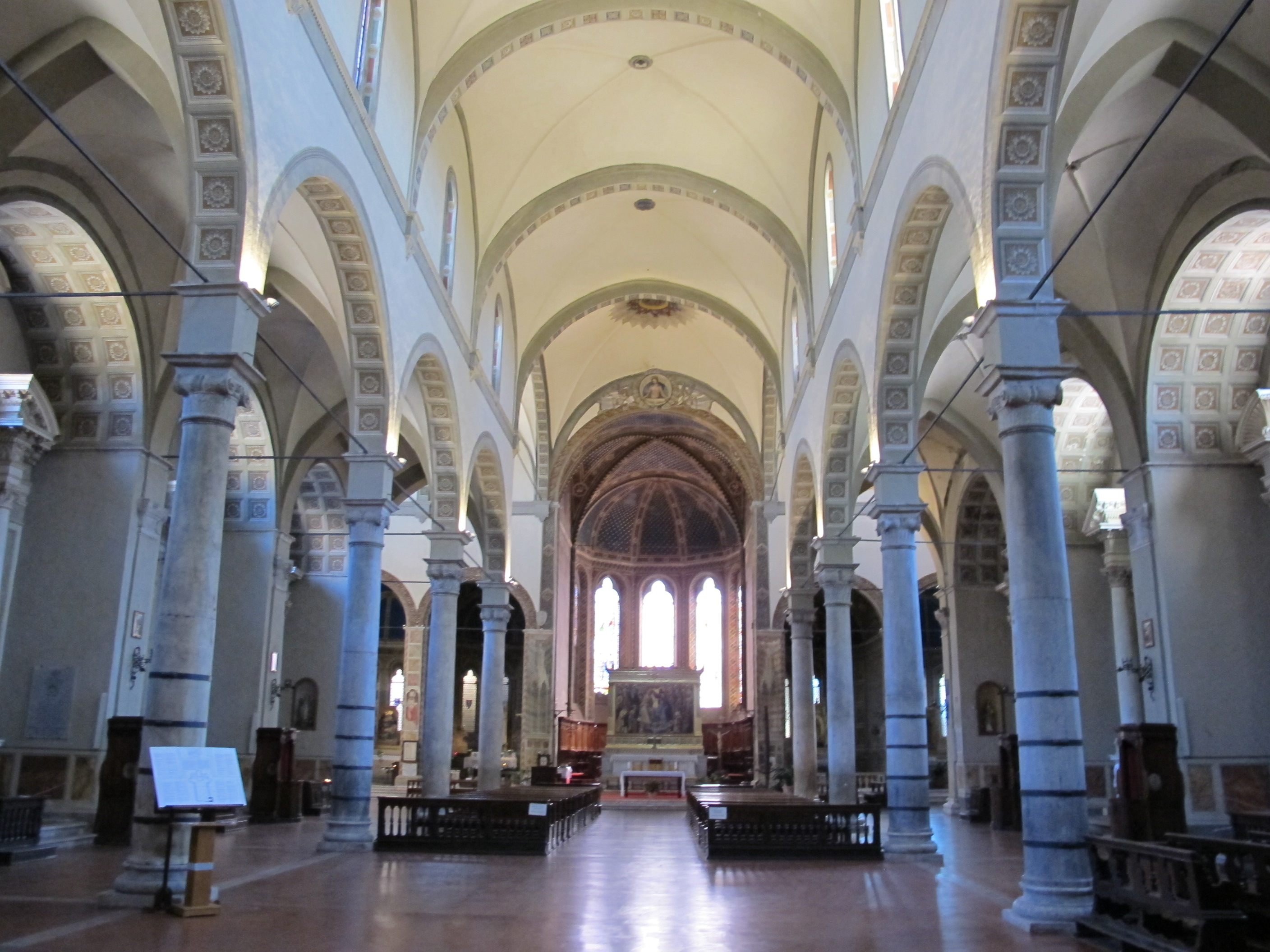
Interior

The interior is in great contrast with the rough and bare aspect of the exterior. A renaissance design is attributed to Baldassare Peruzzi. The church was enlarged in the fourteenth or fifteenth century, as seen in the interior of a Latin cross, where the Gothic style of the transept and apse joins the Renaissance style of the three aisles. The Renaissance style does not continue into the transept and apse, which are in the Gothic style. Near the entrance is a Crucifix of the 14th century and a Holy Water stoup of the 13th century.

=== Works of art ===
The most important works housed in the Santa Maria dei Servi have included :

Coronation of the Virgin altarpiece

- Coronation of the Virgin by Bernardino Fungai. This altarpiece is generally acclaimed as the masterpiece of Fungai and belongs to the period between 1498 and 1501. The four predella panels depicting the life of Saint Clement were sold separately, and were temporarily reunited for an exhibition at the Metropolitan Museum of Art in New York in 1988. The narrative scenes of the four panels are all painted with tempera on wood.
  - Conversion of Saint Clement, housed in the Musée des Beaux-Arts de Strasbourg. The first panel represents the young philosopher, Clement, who having thought that his parents and two brothers were lost at sea turned more seriously to inquire into the question of the immortality of the soul.
  - Reunion of Saint Clement with his family, also housed in the Musée des Beaux-Arts de Strasbourg. The second panel shows Clement reunited with his parents and brothers through the instrumentality of Saint Peter the Apostle
  - Saint Clement Striking the Rock, housed in the City Art Gallery, York, England. The third panel continues the narrative of the life of Saint Clement, after he succeeded Saint Peter as Bishop of Rome.
  - Martyrdom of Saint Clement, also housed in the City Art Gallery, York, England. The final scene depicting highlights in the life of Clement done in tempera and gold on wood, and is noted as the most magically evocative in Fungai's career.
  - The central panel belonging to the predella, depicting The Dead Christ Supported by Two Angels, resurfaced at the 1991 sale of works from the Ferdinand and Imelda Marcos collection at Christie's in New York. The picture was subsequently purchased by the City Art Gallery, York.

It is not known when the Fungai predella panels were dismantled from the altarpiece of the church of Santa Maria dei Servi and then separated. There is a lack of information regarding the dates when these panels found their way into the museums where they are housed at the present.

Predella panels from Fungai

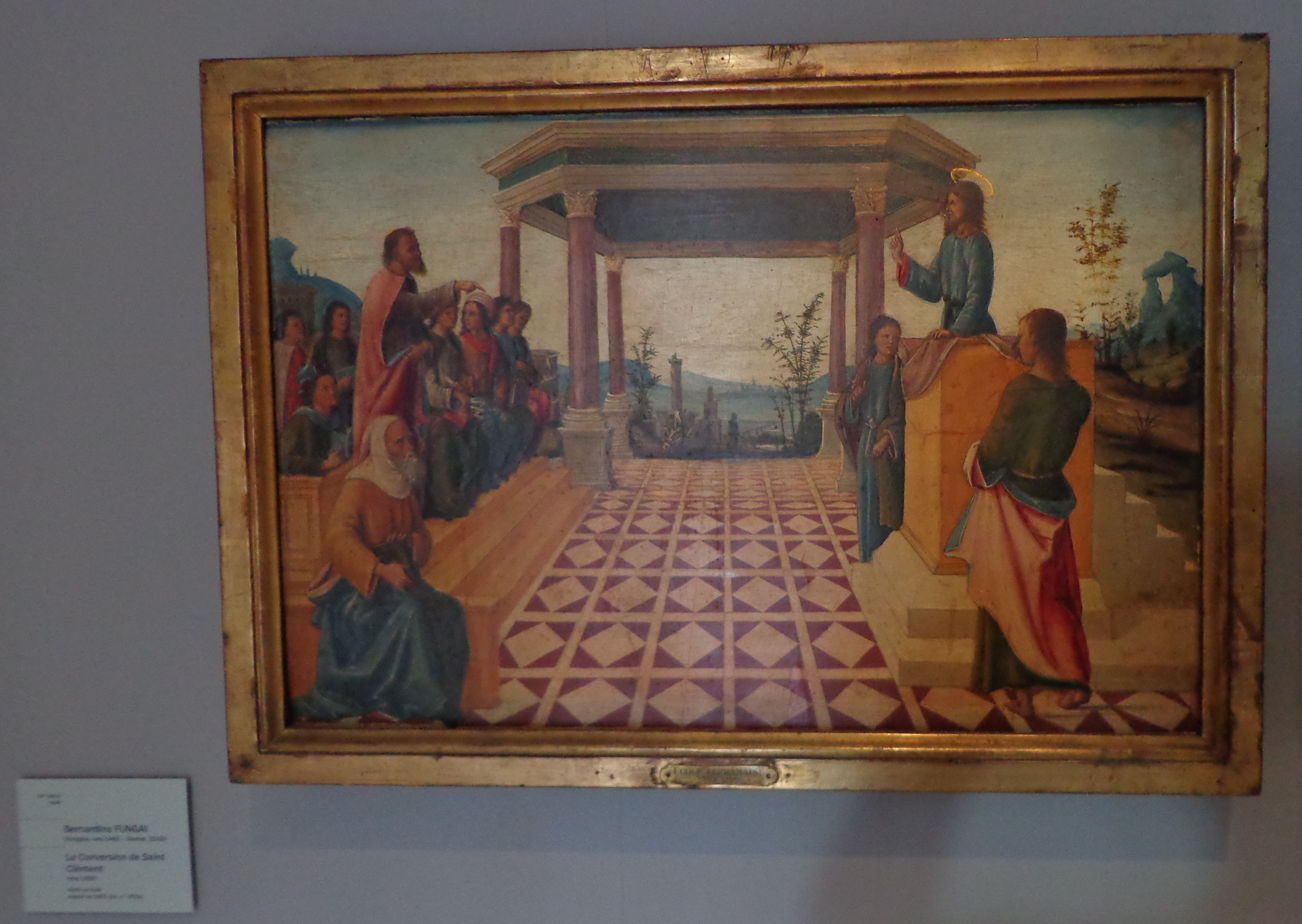
Conversion of St Clement

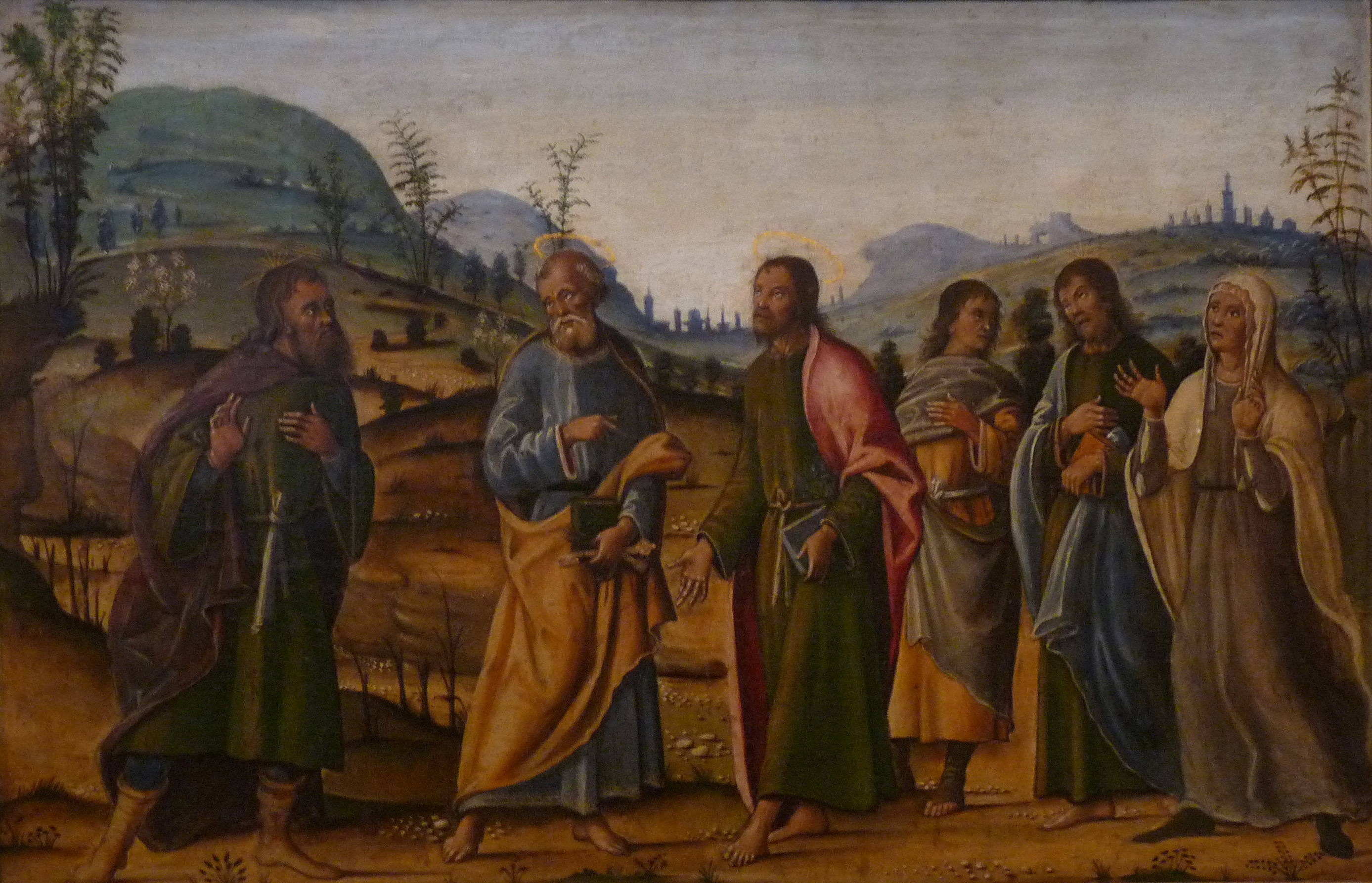
Reunion of St Clement with family

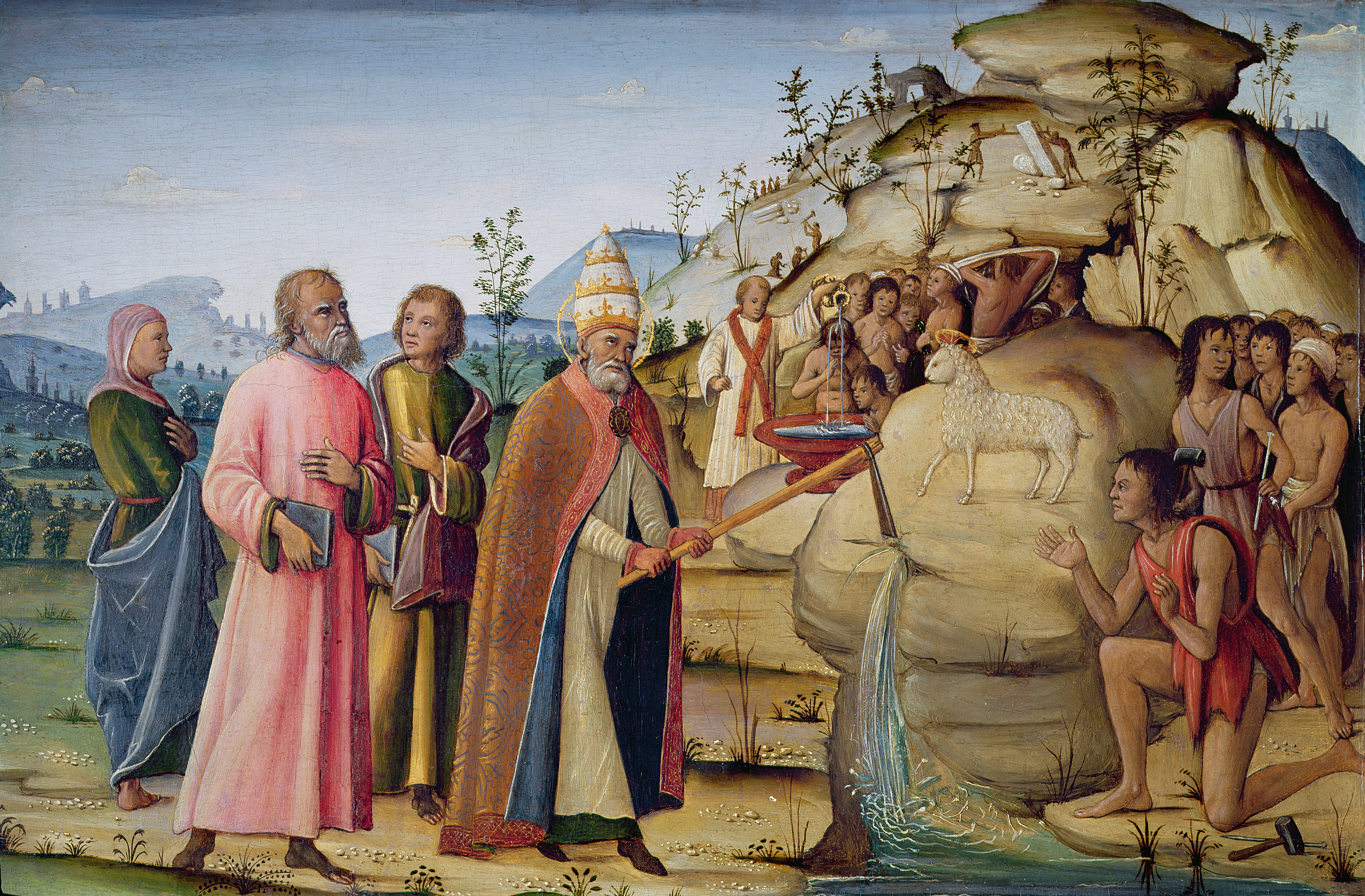
St Clement striking the Rock

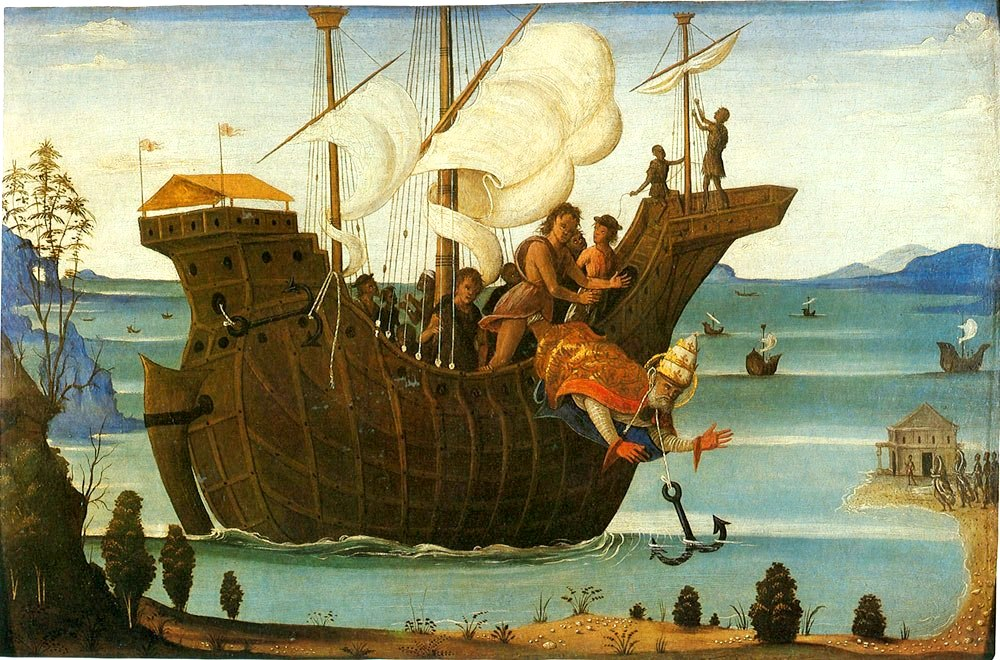
Martyrdom of St Clement

==== Paintings ====
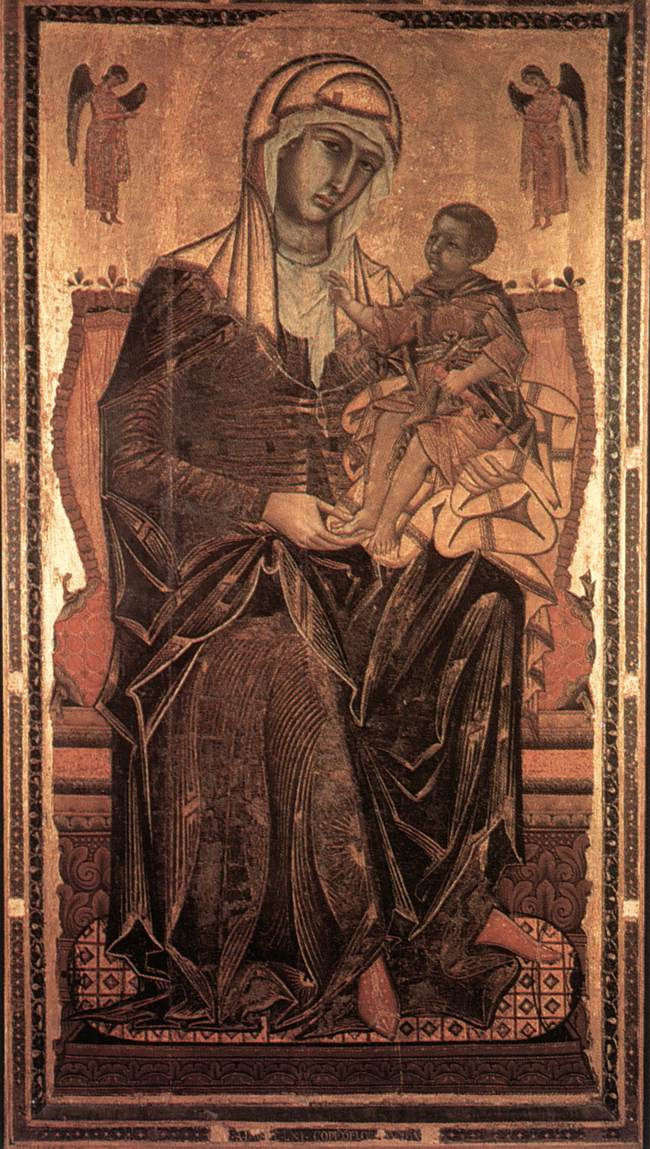
"Madonna del Bordone" by Coppo di Marcovaldo (1261 CE).

- Madonna del Marcovaldo (called Madonna del Bordone) by Coppo di Marcovaldo, signed and dated 1261, in Byzantine style and partially repainted by a pupil of Duccio. Its height of 7 feet 3 inches and its width of 4 feet foreshadow the late-thirteenth-century tendency for panel paintings to approach the scale of frescoes.
- The Massacre of the Innocents by Matteo di Giovanni (1491)
- Adoration of the Shepherds (1404) by Taddeo di Bartolo
- Madonna and Saints by Matteo di Giovanni
- Madonna with child by Duccio di Buoninsegna
- The Slaughter of the Innocents by Pietro Lorenzetti
- Madonna del Popolo by Lippo Memmi
- Herod’s Feast by Pietro Lorenzetti
- The Death of St. John the Evangelist by Pietro Lorenzetti
- Annunciation by Francesco Vanni
- The Madonna of Belvedere of Jacopo di Mino del Pellicciaio and Taddeo di Bartolo (1363)
