= Santa Caterina, Pisa =

Church in Pisa, Tuscany, Italy

Coordinates: 43°43′17.07″N 10°24′12.95″E

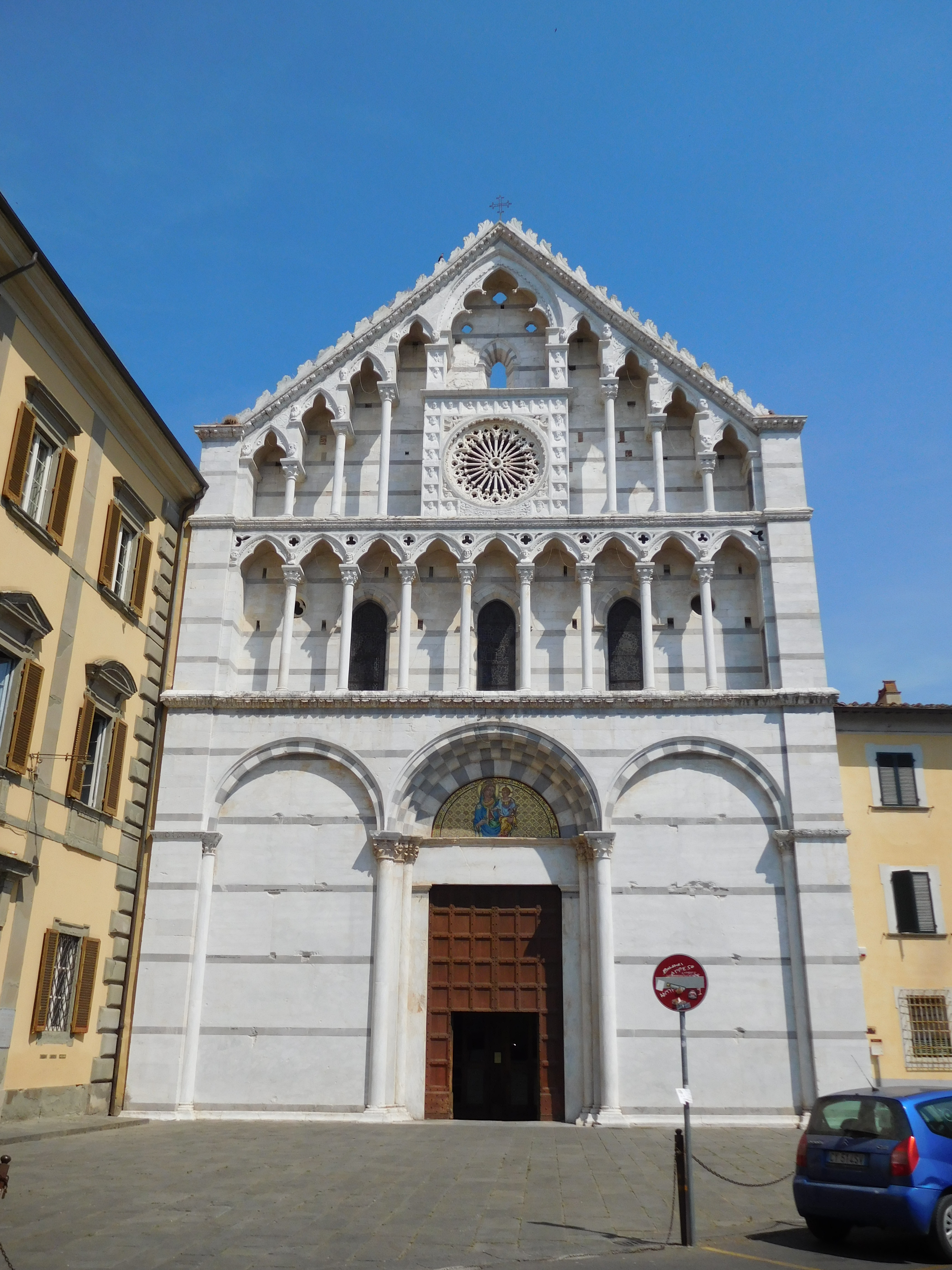
Santa Caterina d'Alessandria.

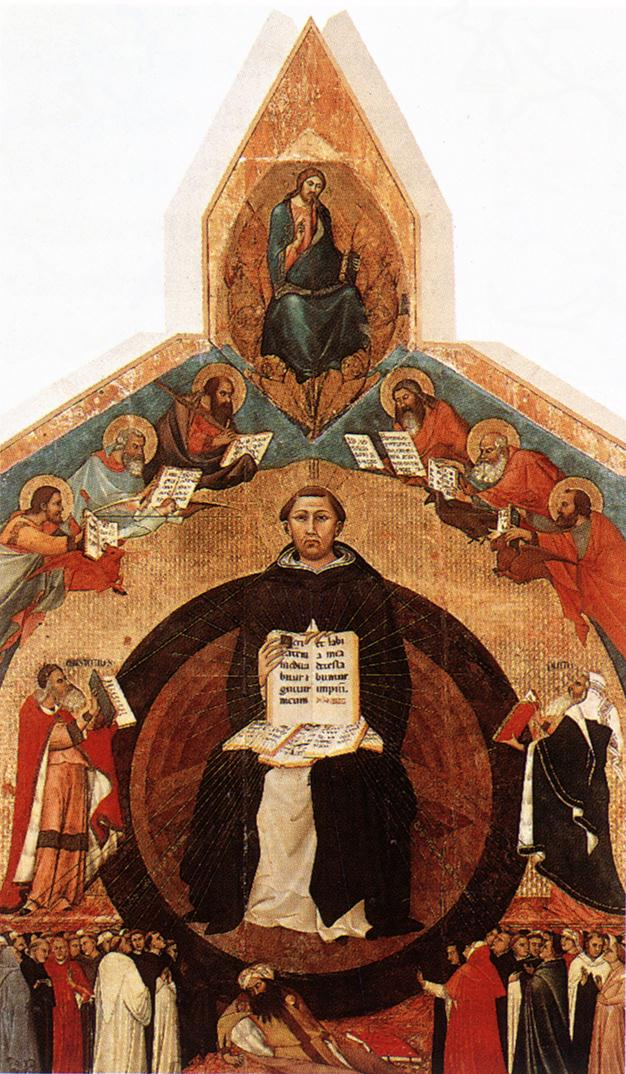
Triumph of St Thomas Aquinas by Lippo Memmi

Santa Caterina d'Alessandria is a Gothic-style Roman Catholic church in Pisa, Tuscany, Italy.

== History ==
Santa Caterina is mentioned for the first time in 1211, then associated with a hospital. The current edifice was built between 1251 and 1300, commissioned by Saint Dominic and entrusted to the friars of his order.

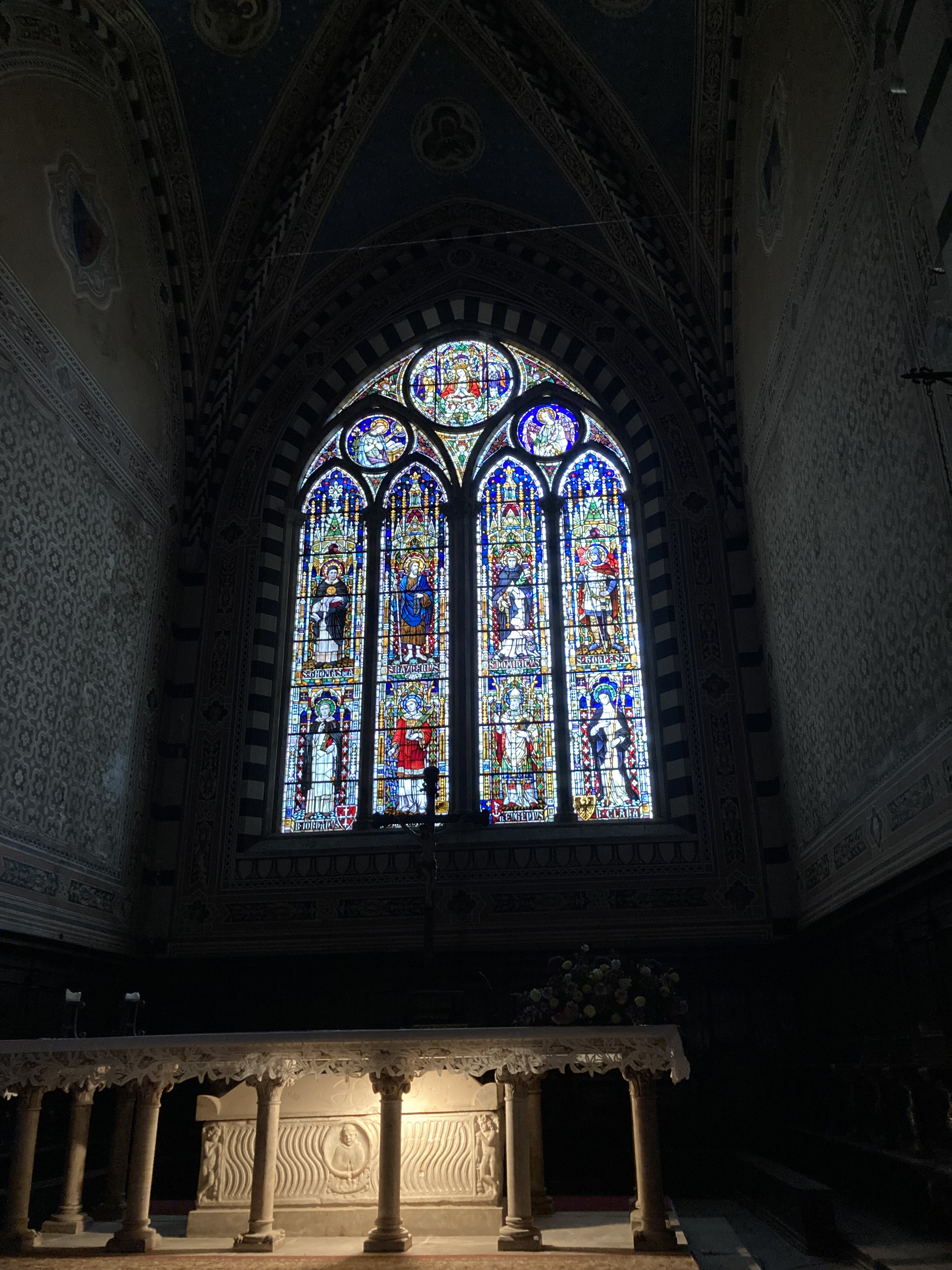
The stained-glass in a Gothic-style Roman Catholic church Santa Caterina d'Alessandria in Pisa

The façade (completed in 1326) has a pointed shape with white and grey marble, with, in the upper section, two orders of small Gothic loggias and a central rose window. The interior, after a fire in 1651, is on a single large hall. Renovated in the 18th century, it houses works by Lippo Memmi (Triumph of St Thomas, 1323), Fra Bartolomeo (Madonna with Sts Peter and Paul, 1511), Santi di Tito, Aurelio Lomi (Martyrdom of St Catherine), Raffaello Vanni, Pietro Dandini (all 16th-17th centuries) and marble sculptures by Andrea Pisano (Tomb of Archbishop Simone Saltarelli, 1343) and his son, Nino Pisano ("Annunciation", 1368).

Also notable is the tomb of Gherardo Compagni, decorated with a late 16th-century "Pietà" statue.

The wooden pulpit from the 17th century, according to the tradition, was that from which St Thomas Acquinas preached.

In 1320, Simone Martini painted for this church the Saint Catherine of Alexandria Polyptych, one of his best known works. It was later moved to the San Matteo Museum in Pisa.

The church is flanked by a bell tower with mullioned windows, attributed to Giovanni di Simone.

== Sources ==
- Barsali, U.; U. Castelli; R. Gagetti; O. Parra (1999). Storia e Capolavori di Pisa. Florence: Bonechi.
- Donati, Roberto. Pisa. Arte e storia. Narni: Plurigraf.
