= Maestà =

Depiction of the enthroned Madonna and Child

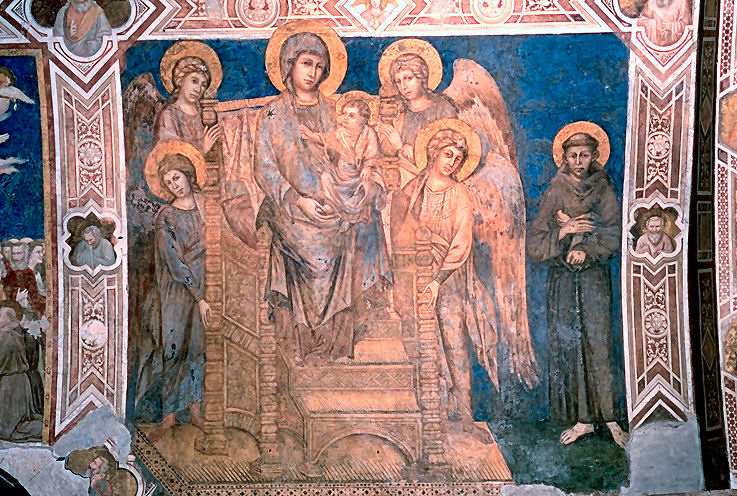
Cimabue's Maestà , Basilica of St. Francis in Assisi.

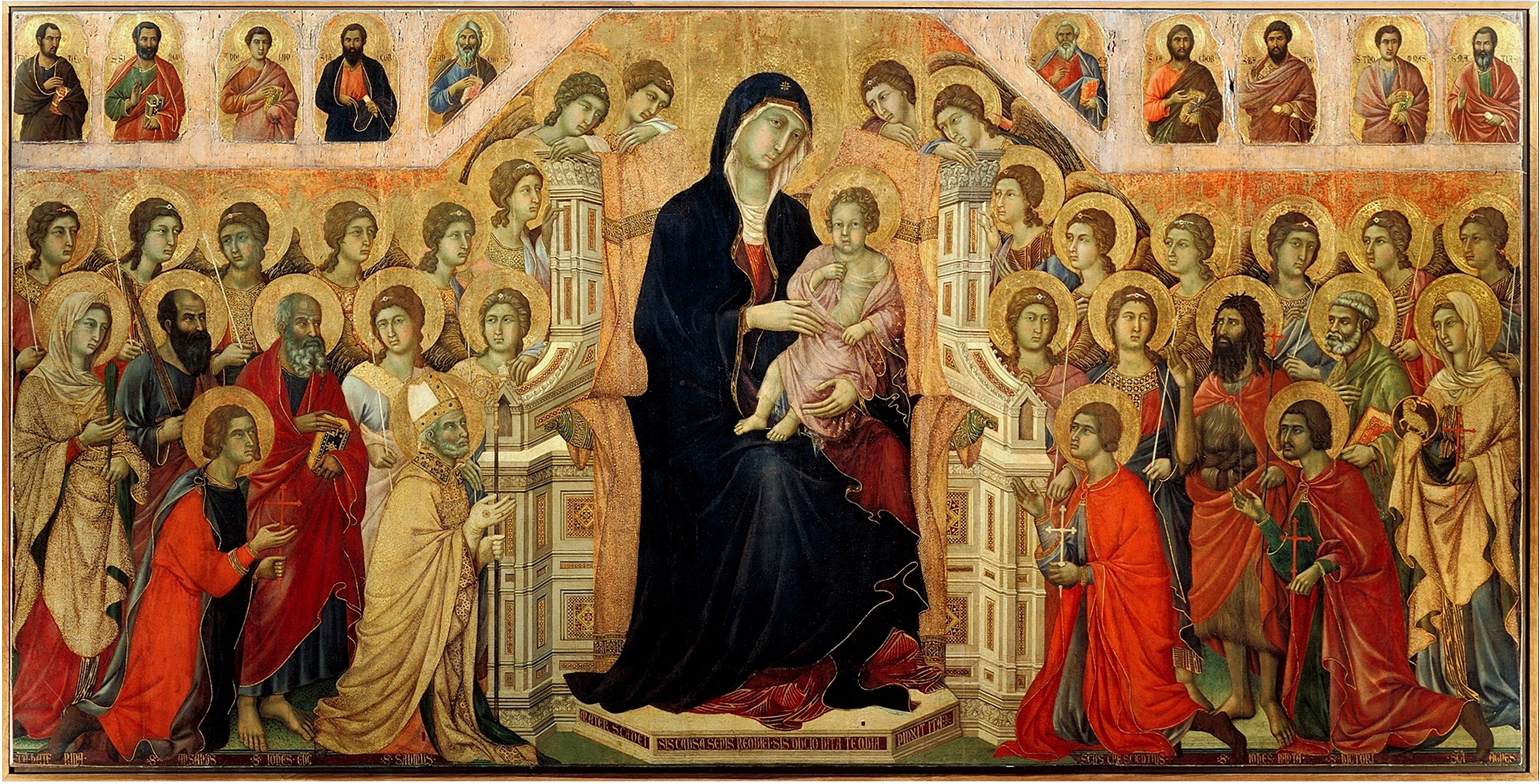
The central panel of Duccio's Maestà with Twenty Angels and Nineteen Saints (1308–1311), Museo dell'Opera del Duomo, Siena.

Maestà [maeˈsta], the Italian word for 'majesty', designates a classification of images of the enthroned Madonna with the child Jesus, the designation generally implying accompaniment by angels, saints, or both. The Maestà is an extension of the "Seat of Wisdom" theme of the seated "Mary Theotokos", "Mary Mother of God", which is a counterpart to the earlier icon of Christ in Majesty, the enthroned Christ that is familiar in Byzantine mosaics. Maria Regina is an art historians' synonym for the iconic image of Mary enthroned, with or without the Child.

In the West, the image seems to have developed from Byzantine precedents such as the coin of Constantine's Empress Fausta, crowned and with their sons on her lap and from literary examples, such as Flavius Cresconius Corippus's celebration of Justin II's coronation in 565. Paintings depicting the Maestà came into the mainstream artistic repertory, especially in Rome, in the late twelfth and early thirteenth centuries, with an increased emphasis on the veneration of Mary. The Maestà was often executed in fresco technique directly on plastered walls or as paintings on gessoed wooden altar panels.

A more domestic representation, suitable to private devotion, is the iconographic theme of Madonna and Child.

== Examples of Maestà in painting ==
The most famous example of the Maestà is the Maestà with Twenty Angels and Nineteen Saints, an altarpiece comprising many individual paintings commissioned by the city of Siena in 1308 from the artist Duccio di Buoninsegna. The painting was installed in the city's cathedral on June 9, 1311. Although it took a generation for its effect truly to be felt, Duccio's Maestà set Italian painting on a course leading away from the hieratic representations of Byzantine art towards more direct presentations of reality.

Creating this altarpiece assembled from many wood panels bonded together before painting was an arduous undertaking. The work was not only large, the central panel was 7 by 13 feet, but it had to be painted on both sides since it could be seen from all directions when installed on the main altar at the centre of the sanctuary.

On the back of the Maesta were episodes from the life of Christ, focusing on his Passion. Sacred narrative unfolds in elegant episodes enacted by graceful figures who seem to dance their way through these stories while still conveying emotional content.

Because the Maesta was dismantled in 1771, its power and beauty can only be imagined from scattered parts, some still in Siena, Italy, but others elsewhere.

Other noted examples of the Maestà are Simone Martini's Maestà in the Palazzo Pubblico, Siena, or Cimabue's fresco in the Basilica of San Francesco d'Assisi.
